

442001–442100 

|-bgcolor=#d6d6d6
| 442001 ||  || — || July 17, 2010 || WISE || WISE || — || align=right | 4.7 km || 
|-id=002 bgcolor=#d6d6d6
| 442002 ||  || — || July 18, 2010 || WISE || WISE || — || align=right | 4.5 km || 
|-id=003 bgcolor=#d6d6d6
| 442003 ||  || — || November 5, 2005 || Kitt Peak || Spacewatch || — || align=right | 4.5 km || 
|-id=004 bgcolor=#d6d6d6
| 442004 ||  || — || May 28, 2008 || Kitt Peak || Spacewatch || — || align=right | 3.4 km || 
|-id=005 bgcolor=#d6d6d6
| 442005 ||  || — || July 19, 2010 || WISE || WISE || — || align=right | 2.0 km || 
|-id=006 bgcolor=#d6d6d6
| 442006 ||  || — || July 19, 2010 || WISE || WISE || — || align=right | 5.4 km || 
|-id=007 bgcolor=#d6d6d6
| 442007 ||  || — || September 7, 2004 || Kitt Peak || Spacewatch || — || align=right | 3.9 km || 
|-id=008 bgcolor=#d6d6d6
| 442008 ||  || — || April 1, 2008 || Mount Lemmon || Mount Lemmon Survey || — || align=right | 3.7 km || 
|-id=009 bgcolor=#d6d6d6
| 442009 ||  || — || December 24, 2006 || Kitt Peak || Spacewatch || — || align=right | 3.5 km || 
|-id=010 bgcolor=#d6d6d6
| 442010 ||  || — || July 22, 2010 || WISE || WISE || — || align=right | 2.5 km || 
|-id=011 bgcolor=#d6d6d6
| 442011 ||  || — || July 23, 2010 || WISE || WISE || — || align=right | 3.7 km || 
|-id=012 bgcolor=#d6d6d6
| 442012 ||  || — || July 24, 2010 || WISE || WISE || URS || align=right | 3.2 km || 
|-id=013 bgcolor=#d6d6d6
| 442013 ||  || — || December 7, 2005 || Kitt Peak || Spacewatch || HYG || align=right | 3.3 km || 
|-id=014 bgcolor=#d6d6d6
| 442014 ||  || — || July 25, 2010 || WISE || WISE || LIX || align=right | 3.3 km || 
|-id=015 bgcolor=#d6d6d6
| 442015 ||  || — || July 25, 2010 || WISE || WISE || — || align=right | 4.3 km || 
|-id=016 bgcolor=#d6d6d6
| 442016 ||  || — || August 8, 2004 || Anderson Mesa || LONEOS || — || align=right | 3.5 km || 
|-id=017 bgcolor=#d6d6d6
| 442017 ||  || — || November 29, 2005 || Kitt Peak || Spacewatch || — || align=right | 5.4 km || 
|-id=018 bgcolor=#d6d6d6
| 442018 ||  || — || April 13, 2008 || Kitt Peak || Spacewatch || — || align=right | 3.2 km || 
|-id=019 bgcolor=#d6d6d6
| 442019 ||  || — || April 24, 2003 || Kitt Peak || Spacewatch || — || align=right | 3.5 km || 
|-id=020 bgcolor=#d6d6d6
| 442020 ||  || — || July 29, 2010 || WISE || WISE || — || align=right | 2.3 km || 
|-id=021 bgcolor=#d6d6d6
| 442021 ||  || — || September 7, 2004 || Kitt Peak || Spacewatch || — || align=right | 4.5 km || 
|-id=022 bgcolor=#d6d6d6
| 442022 ||  || — || April 15, 2008 || Mount Lemmon || Mount Lemmon Survey || VER || align=right | 3.0 km || 
|-id=023 bgcolor=#E9E9E9
| 442023 ||  || — || July 30, 2010 || WISE || WISE || — || align=right | 3.2 km || 
|-id=024 bgcolor=#d6d6d6
| 442024 ||  || — || December 2, 2005 || Mount Lemmon || Mount Lemmon Survey || — || align=right | 3.0 km || 
|-id=025 bgcolor=#d6d6d6
| 442025 ||  || — || July 30, 2010 || WISE || WISE || — || align=right | 3.3 km || 
|-id=026 bgcolor=#d6d6d6
| 442026 ||  || — || July 31, 2010 || WISE || WISE || — || align=right | 3.4 km || 
|-id=027 bgcolor=#d6d6d6
| 442027 ||  || — || January 28, 2007 || Mount Lemmon || Mount Lemmon Survey || — || align=right | 2.5 km || 
|-id=028 bgcolor=#d6d6d6
| 442028 ||  || — || December 27, 2006 || Mount Lemmon || Mount Lemmon Survey || — || align=right | 4.9 km || 
|-id=029 bgcolor=#d6d6d6
| 442029 ||  || — || August 1, 2010 || WISE || WISE || URS || align=right | 4.3 km || 
|-id=030 bgcolor=#d6d6d6
| 442030 ||  || — || December 25, 2005 || Kitt Peak || Spacewatch || LIX || align=right | 3.0 km || 
|-id=031 bgcolor=#d6d6d6
| 442031 ||  || — || April 6, 2008 || Kitt Peak || Spacewatch || — || align=right | 4.8 km || 
|-id=032 bgcolor=#d6d6d6
| 442032 ||  || — || August 4, 2010 || WISE || WISE || VER || align=right | 3.2 km || 
|-id=033 bgcolor=#d6d6d6
| 442033 ||  || — || August 5, 2010 || WISE || WISE || — || align=right | 2.6 km || 
|-id=034 bgcolor=#d6d6d6
| 442034 ||  || — || May 14, 2008 || Mount Lemmon || Mount Lemmon Survey || VER || align=right | 3.9 km || 
|-id=035 bgcolor=#d6d6d6
| 442035 ||  || — || August 10, 2010 || Kitt Peak || Spacewatch || EOS || align=right | 2.1 km || 
|-id=036 bgcolor=#fefefe
| 442036 ||  || — || November 30, 2008 || Mount Lemmon || Mount Lemmon Survey || H || align=right data-sort-value="0.88" | 880 m || 
|-id=037 bgcolor=#FFC2E0
| 442037 ||  || — || July 22, 2010 || WISE || WISE || APOPHAfast || align=right data-sort-value="0.49" | 490 m || 
|-id=038 bgcolor=#d6d6d6
| 442038 ||  || — || August 9, 2010 || WISE || WISE || — || align=right | 4.0 km || 
|-id=039 bgcolor=#d6d6d6
| 442039 ||  || — || January 19, 2002 || Kitt Peak || Spacewatch || — || align=right | 3.5 km || 
|-id=040 bgcolor=#d6d6d6
| 442040 ||  || — || August 10, 2010 || Kitt Peak || Spacewatch || — || align=right | 2.6 km || 
|-id=041 bgcolor=#d6d6d6
| 442041 ||  || — || October 6, 2005 || Kitt Peak || Spacewatch || — || align=right | 2.2 km || 
|-id=042 bgcolor=#d6d6d6
| 442042 ||  || — || September 2, 2010 || Mount Lemmon || Mount Lemmon Survey || EOS || align=right | 2.1 km || 
|-id=043 bgcolor=#d6d6d6
| 442043 ||  || — || September 2, 2010 || Mount Lemmon || Mount Lemmon Survey || — || align=right | 2.4 km || 
|-id=044 bgcolor=#d6d6d6
| 442044 ||  || — || September 2, 2010 || Mount Lemmon || Mount Lemmon Survey || — || align=right | 1.9 km || 
|-id=045 bgcolor=#d6d6d6
| 442045 ||  || — || October 1, 2005 || Kitt Peak || Spacewatch || — || align=right | 2.8 km || 
|-id=046 bgcolor=#E9E9E9
| 442046 ||  || — || September 23, 2001 || Kitt Peak || Spacewatch || — || align=right | 2.3 km || 
|-id=047 bgcolor=#d6d6d6
| 442047 ||  || — || September 4, 2010 || Mount Lemmon || Mount Lemmon Survey || — || align=right | 2.4 km || 
|-id=048 bgcolor=#d6d6d6
| 442048 ||  || — || August 31, 2005 || Kitt Peak || Spacewatch || EOS || align=right | 1.6 km || 
|-id=049 bgcolor=#E9E9E9
| 442049 ||  || — || August 6, 2010 || Kitt Peak || Spacewatch || — || align=right | 2.3 km || 
|-id=050 bgcolor=#d6d6d6
| 442050 ||  || — || February 26, 2007 || Mount Lemmon || Mount Lemmon Survey || — || align=right | 2.8 km || 
|-id=051 bgcolor=#d6d6d6
| 442051 ||  || — || September 4, 2010 || Kitt Peak || Spacewatch || TIR || align=right | 3.9 km || 
|-id=052 bgcolor=#d6d6d6
| 442052 ||  || — || September 6, 2010 || Socorro || LINEAR || — || align=right | 3.0 km || 
|-id=053 bgcolor=#d6d6d6
| 442053 ||  || — || January 17, 2007 || Kitt Peak || Spacewatch || — || align=right | 3.0 km || 
|-id=054 bgcolor=#d6d6d6
| 442054 ||  || — || September 5, 2010 || Mount Lemmon || Mount Lemmon Survey || — || align=right | 3.4 km || 
|-id=055 bgcolor=#d6d6d6
| 442055 ||  || — || January 28, 2007 || Kitt Peak || Spacewatch || VER || align=right | 3.2 km || 
|-id=056 bgcolor=#d6d6d6
| 442056 ||  || — || September 6, 2010 || Kitt Peak || Spacewatch || — || align=right | 3.0 km || 
|-id=057 bgcolor=#d6d6d6
| 442057 ||  || — || September 7, 2010 || La Sagra || OAM Obs. || — || align=right | 4.1 km || 
|-id=058 bgcolor=#d6d6d6
| 442058 ||  || — || September 10, 2010 || Kitt Peak || Spacewatch || — || align=right | 3.1 km || 
|-id=059 bgcolor=#d6d6d6
| 442059 ||  || — || November 6, 2005 || Mount Lemmon || Mount Lemmon Survey || — || align=right | 1.9 km || 
|-id=060 bgcolor=#d6d6d6
| 442060 ||  || — || September 11, 2010 || Kitt Peak || Spacewatch || — || align=right | 3.4 km || 
|-id=061 bgcolor=#d6d6d6
| 442061 ||  || — || March 10, 2008 || Kitt Peak || Spacewatch || — || align=right | 2.7 km || 
|-id=062 bgcolor=#d6d6d6
| 442062 ||  || — || September 11, 2010 || Kitt Peak || Spacewatch || — || align=right | 3.0 km || 
|-id=063 bgcolor=#d6d6d6
| 442063 ||  || — || September 11, 2010 || Mount Lemmon || Mount Lemmon Survey || — || align=right | 2.3 km || 
|-id=064 bgcolor=#d6d6d6
| 442064 ||  || — || March 18, 2009 || Kitt Peak || Spacewatch || — || align=right | 2.3 km || 
|-id=065 bgcolor=#d6d6d6
| 442065 ||  || — || October 10, 1999 || Kitt Peak || Spacewatch || — || align=right | 2.8 km || 
|-id=066 bgcolor=#d6d6d6
| 442066 ||  || — || August 6, 2010 || Kitt Peak || Spacewatch || — || align=right | 2.9 km || 
|-id=067 bgcolor=#d6d6d6
| 442067 ||  || — || April 26, 2003 || Campo Imperatore || CINEOS || — || align=right | 3.5 km || 
|-id=068 bgcolor=#d6d6d6
| 442068 ||  || — || September 10, 2010 || Kitt Peak || Spacewatch || — || align=right | 2.8 km || 
|-id=069 bgcolor=#d6d6d6
| 442069 ||  || — || September 15, 2010 || Kitt Peak || Spacewatch || EOS || align=right | 1.7 km || 
|-id=070 bgcolor=#d6d6d6
| 442070 ||  || — || September 15, 2010 || Kitt Peak || Spacewatch || EOS || align=right | 1.7 km || 
|-id=071 bgcolor=#d6d6d6
| 442071 ||  || — || October 30, 2005 || Kitt Peak || Spacewatch || THM || align=right | 1.5 km || 
|-id=072 bgcolor=#d6d6d6
| 442072 ||  || — || September 15, 2010 || Kitt Peak || Spacewatch || — || align=right | 3.7 km || 
|-id=073 bgcolor=#d6d6d6
| 442073 ||  || — || September 15, 2010 || Kitt Peak || Spacewatch || — || align=right | 2.1 km || 
|-id=074 bgcolor=#d6d6d6
| 442074 ||  || — || January 17, 2007 || Kitt Peak || Spacewatch || — || align=right | 2.7 km || 
|-id=075 bgcolor=#d6d6d6
| 442075 ||  || — || January 10, 2007 || Kitt Peak || Spacewatch || — || align=right | 2.7 km || 
|-id=076 bgcolor=#d6d6d6
| 442076 ||  || — || September 10, 2010 || Kitt Peak || Spacewatch || — || align=right | 2.7 km || 
|-id=077 bgcolor=#d6d6d6
| 442077 ||  || — || September 10, 2010 || Kitt Peak || Spacewatch || EOS || align=right | 1.7 km || 
|-id=078 bgcolor=#d6d6d6
| 442078 ||  || — || November 5, 1999 || Kitt Peak || Spacewatch || — || align=right | 2.4 km || 
|-id=079 bgcolor=#d6d6d6
| 442079 ||  || — || April 5, 2003 || Kitt Peak || Spacewatch || THM || align=right | 2.8 km || 
|-id=080 bgcolor=#d6d6d6
| 442080 ||  || — || March 5, 2008 || Mount Lemmon || Mount Lemmon Survey || — || align=right | 2.3 km || 
|-id=081 bgcolor=#d6d6d6
| 442081 ||  || — || January 14, 2002 || Kitt Peak || Spacewatch || EOS || align=right | 2.1 km || 
|-id=082 bgcolor=#d6d6d6
| 442082 ||  || — || September 14, 2010 || Kitt Peak || Spacewatch || — || align=right | 2.5 km || 
|-id=083 bgcolor=#d6d6d6
| 442083 ||  || — || September 14, 1999 || Kitt Peak || Spacewatch || THM || align=right | 1.8 km || 
|-id=084 bgcolor=#d6d6d6
| 442084 ||  || — || October 31, 2005 || Mount Lemmon || Mount Lemmon Survey || — || align=right | 2.2 km || 
|-id=085 bgcolor=#d6d6d6
| 442085 ||  || — || March 10, 2007 || Mount Lemmon || Mount Lemmon Survey || — || align=right | 3.1 km || 
|-id=086 bgcolor=#fefefe
| 442086 ||  || — || January 25, 2006 || Catalina || CSS || H || align=right data-sort-value="0.79" | 790 m || 
|-id=087 bgcolor=#d6d6d6
| 442087 ||  || — || September 17, 2010 || Catalina || CSS || — || align=right | 3.2 km || 
|-id=088 bgcolor=#d6d6d6
| 442088 ||  || — || October 3, 1999 || Kitt Peak || Spacewatch || — || align=right | 2.2 km || 
|-id=089 bgcolor=#d6d6d6
| 442089 ||  || — || September 2, 2010 || Mount Lemmon || Mount Lemmon Survey || — || align=right | 2.5 km || 
|-id=090 bgcolor=#d6d6d6
| 442090 ||  || — || February 21, 2007 || Kitt Peak || Spacewatch || — || align=right | 2.9 km || 
|-id=091 bgcolor=#d6d6d6
| 442091 ||  || — || September 19, 2010 || Kitt Peak || Spacewatch || — || align=right | 2.6 km || 
|-id=092 bgcolor=#d6d6d6
| 442092 ||  || — || March 12, 2008 || Kitt Peak || Spacewatch || — || align=right | 2.6 km || 
|-id=093 bgcolor=#d6d6d6
| 442093 ||  || — || November 3, 2005 || Mount Lemmon || Mount Lemmon Survey || — || align=right | 2.0 km || 
|-id=094 bgcolor=#d6d6d6
| 442094 ||  || — || March 14, 2007 || Mount Lemmon || Mount Lemmon Survey || — || align=right | 2.5 km || 
|-id=095 bgcolor=#d6d6d6
| 442095 ||  || — || December 1, 2005 || Mount Lemmon || Mount Lemmon Survey || — || align=right | 2.3 km || 
|-id=096 bgcolor=#d6d6d6
| 442096 ||  || — || November 30, 2005 || Kitt Peak || Spacewatch || THM || align=right | 1.6 km || 
|-id=097 bgcolor=#d6d6d6
| 442097 ||  || — || October 25, 2005 || Kitt Peak || Spacewatch ||  || align=right | 2.7 km || 
|-id=098 bgcolor=#d6d6d6
| 442098 ||  || — || October 6, 2005 || Kitt Peak || Spacewatch || — || align=right | 2.8 km || 
|-id=099 bgcolor=#d6d6d6
| 442099 ||  || — || July 6, 2010 || WISE || WISE || VER || align=right | 3.4 km || 
|-id=100 bgcolor=#d6d6d6
| 442100 ||  || — || October 22, 2005 || Kitt Peak || Spacewatch || EOS || align=right | 1.6 km || 
|}

442101–442200 

|-bgcolor=#d6d6d6
| 442101 ||  || — || October 27, 2005 || Mount Lemmon || Mount Lemmon Survey || THM || align=right | 2.2 km || 
|-id=102 bgcolor=#d6d6d6
| 442102 ||  || — || September 17, 2010 || Kitt Peak || Spacewatch || HYG || align=right | 2.1 km || 
|-id=103 bgcolor=#d6d6d6
| 442103 ||  || — || September 11, 2010 || Kitt Peak || Spacewatch || — || align=right | 2.7 km || 
|-id=104 bgcolor=#d6d6d6
| 442104 ||  || — || December 1, 2005 || Mount Lemmon || Mount Lemmon Survey || THM || align=right | 1.6 km || 
|-id=105 bgcolor=#d6d6d6
| 442105 ||  || — || November 1, 2005 || Mount Lemmon || Mount Lemmon Survey || — || align=right | 1.5 km || 
|-id=106 bgcolor=#d6d6d6
| 442106 ||  || — || September 16, 2010 || Kitt Peak || Spacewatch || EOS || align=right | 1.8 km || 
|-id=107 bgcolor=#d6d6d6
| 442107 ||  || — || December 1, 2005 || Kitt Peak || Spacewatch || — || align=right | 3.2 km || 
|-id=108 bgcolor=#d6d6d6
| 442108 ||  || — || October 11, 2010 || Mount Lemmon || Mount Lemmon Survey || — || align=right | 2.8 km || 
|-id=109 bgcolor=#d6d6d6
| 442109 ||  || — || November 26, 2005 || Kitt Peak || Spacewatch || — || align=right | 2.0 km || 
|-id=110 bgcolor=#d6d6d6
| 442110 ||  || — || September 30, 2010 || Catalina || CSS || LIX || align=right | 3.7 km || 
|-id=111 bgcolor=#d6d6d6
| 442111 ||  || — || October 24, 2005 || Kitt Peak || Spacewatch || EOS || align=right | 1.9 km || 
|-id=112 bgcolor=#d6d6d6
| 442112 ||  || — || September 17, 2010 || Kitt Peak || Spacewatch || HYG || align=right | 2.8 km || 
|-id=113 bgcolor=#d6d6d6
| 442113 ||  || — || October 31, 1999 || Kitt Peak || Spacewatch || THM || align=right | 1.7 km || 
|-id=114 bgcolor=#d6d6d6
| 442114 ||  || — || October 10, 2010 || Kitt Peak || Spacewatch || — || align=right | 2.3 km || 
|-id=115 bgcolor=#d6d6d6
| 442115 ||  || — || October 9, 2010 || Catalina || CSS || EOS || align=right | 2.5 km || 
|-id=116 bgcolor=#d6d6d6
| 442116 ||  || — || December 13, 2006 || Mount Lemmon || Mount Lemmon Survey || — || align=right | 3.0 km || 
|-id=117 bgcolor=#d6d6d6
| 442117 ||  || — || August 15, 2004 || Campo Imperatore || CINEOS || — || align=right | 2.4 km || 
|-id=118 bgcolor=#d6d6d6
| 442118 ||  || — || September 18, 2010 || Mount Lemmon || Mount Lemmon Survey || — || align=right | 2.8 km || 
|-id=119 bgcolor=#d6d6d6
| 442119 ||  || — || October 7, 2010 || Catalina || CSS || — || align=right | 3.8 km || 
|-id=120 bgcolor=#d6d6d6
| 442120 ||  || — || November 10, 2005 || Catalina || CSS || — || align=right | 3.7 km || 
|-id=121 bgcolor=#d6d6d6
| 442121 ||  || — || October 1, 2010 || Catalina || CSS || — || align=right | 3.4 km || 
|-id=122 bgcolor=#d6d6d6
| 442122 ||  || — || September 15, 2010 || Kitt Peak || Spacewatch || — || align=right | 2.5 km || 
|-id=123 bgcolor=#d6d6d6
| 442123 ||  || — || March 11, 2008 || Kitt Peak || Spacewatch || — || align=right | 3.4 km || 
|-id=124 bgcolor=#d6d6d6
| 442124 ||  || — || March 30, 2008 || Kitt Peak || Spacewatch || — || align=right | 3.2 km || 
|-id=125 bgcolor=#d6d6d6
| 442125 ||  || — || October 8, 1993 || Kitt Peak || Spacewatch || — || align=right | 4.1 km || 
|-id=126 bgcolor=#d6d6d6
| 442126 ||  || — || February 21, 2007 || Mount Lemmon || Mount Lemmon Survey || VER || align=right | 2.8 km || 
|-id=127 bgcolor=#d6d6d6
| 442127 ||  || — || November 25, 2005 || Kitt Peak || Spacewatch || — || align=right | 2.0 km || 
|-id=128 bgcolor=#d6d6d6
| 442128 ||  || — || August 12, 2010 || Kitt Peak || Spacewatch || — || align=right | 2.5 km || 
|-id=129 bgcolor=#d6d6d6
| 442129 ||  || — || October 7, 2004 || Anderson Mesa || LONEOS || — || align=right | 3.8 km || 
|-id=130 bgcolor=#d6d6d6
| 442130 ||  || — || September 11, 2004 || Kitt Peak || Spacewatch || — || align=right | 3.1 km || 
|-id=131 bgcolor=#d6d6d6
| 442131 ||  || — || November 30, 2005 || Kitt Peak || Spacewatch || — || align=right | 2.8 km || 
|-id=132 bgcolor=#d6d6d6
| 442132 ||  || — || October 29, 2010 || Mount Lemmon || Mount Lemmon Survey || — || align=right | 3.3 km || 
|-id=133 bgcolor=#fefefe
| 442133 ||  || — || September 16, 2010 || Catalina || CSS || H || align=right data-sort-value="0.68" | 680 m || 
|-id=134 bgcolor=#d6d6d6
| 442134 ||  || — || November 1, 1999 || Kitt Peak || Spacewatch || HYG || align=right | 2.2 km || 
|-id=135 bgcolor=#d6d6d6
| 442135 ||  || — || July 21, 2010 || WISE || WISE || — || align=right | 3.7 km || 
|-id=136 bgcolor=#d6d6d6
| 442136 ||  || — || September 3, 2010 || Mount Lemmon || Mount Lemmon Survey || — || align=right | 3.3 km || 
|-id=137 bgcolor=#d6d6d6
| 442137 ||  || — || August 9, 2010 || WISE || WISE || — || align=right | 3.2 km || 
|-id=138 bgcolor=#d6d6d6
| 442138 ||  || — || September 14, 1999 || Catalina || CSS || — || align=right | 2.6 km || 
|-id=139 bgcolor=#d6d6d6
| 442139 ||  || — || September 11, 2004 || Socorro || LINEAR || URS || align=right | 3.8 km || 
|-id=140 bgcolor=#d6d6d6
| 442140 ||  || — || December 30, 2005 || Mount Lemmon || Mount Lemmon Survey || HYG || align=right | 2.3 km || 
|-id=141 bgcolor=#d6d6d6
| 442141 ||  || — || October 12, 2010 || Mount Lemmon || Mount Lemmon Survey || — || align=right | 3.2 km || 
|-id=142 bgcolor=#d6d6d6
| 442142 ||  || — || February 21, 2007 || Kitt Peak || Spacewatch || EOS || align=right | 2.0 km || 
|-id=143 bgcolor=#d6d6d6
| 442143 ||  || — || September 11, 2010 || Mount Lemmon || Mount Lemmon Survey || HYG || align=right | 2.4 km || 
|-id=144 bgcolor=#d6d6d6
| 442144 ||  || — || September 11, 2010 || Mount Lemmon || Mount Lemmon Survey || — || align=right | 2.8 km || 
|-id=145 bgcolor=#d6d6d6
| 442145 ||  || — || October 11, 2005 || Kitt Peak || Spacewatch || EOS || align=right | 2.8 km || 
|-id=146 bgcolor=#d6d6d6
| 442146 ||  || — || November 4, 2010 || Mount Lemmon || Mount Lemmon Survey || — || align=right | 3.2 km || 
|-id=147 bgcolor=#d6d6d6
| 442147 ||  || — || August 6, 2010 || WISE || WISE || — || align=right | 4.2 km || 
|-id=148 bgcolor=#FA8072
| 442148 ||  || — || May 25, 2007 || Mount Lemmon || Mount Lemmon Survey || — || align=right data-sort-value="0.49" | 490 m || 
|-id=149 bgcolor=#d6d6d6
| 442149 ||  || — || October 9, 2004 || Anderson Mesa || LONEOS || — || align=right | 3.3 km || 
|-id=150 bgcolor=#d6d6d6
| 442150 ||  || — || December 30, 2005 || Kitt Peak || Spacewatch || — || align=right | 3.7 km || 
|-id=151 bgcolor=#d6d6d6
| 442151 ||  || — || October 7, 2004 || Kitt Peak || Spacewatch || VER || align=right | 2.6 km || 
|-id=152 bgcolor=#d6d6d6
| 442152 ||  || — || December 4, 2005 || Kitt Peak || Spacewatch || — || align=right | 3.4 km || 
|-id=153 bgcolor=#d6d6d6
| 442153 ||  || — || February 16, 2001 || Kitt Peak || Spacewatch || — || align=right | 3.1 km || 
|-id=154 bgcolor=#d6d6d6
| 442154 ||  || — || December 8, 2005 || Kitt Peak || Spacewatch || TIR || align=right | 2.5 km || 
|-id=155 bgcolor=#fefefe
| 442155 ||  || — || May 12, 2004 || Siding Spring || SSS || H || align=right data-sort-value="0.67" | 670 m || 
|-id=156 bgcolor=#d6d6d6
| 442156 ||  || — || November 10, 2005 || Mount Lemmon || Mount Lemmon Survey || — || align=right | 2.6 km || 
|-id=157 bgcolor=#d6d6d6
| 442157 ||  || — || September 5, 2010 || Mount Lemmon || Mount Lemmon Survey || HYG || align=right | 3.1 km || 
|-id=158 bgcolor=#d6d6d6
| 442158 ||  || — || January 6, 2006 || Catalina || CSS || — || align=right | 4.1 km || 
|-id=159 bgcolor=#d6d6d6
| 442159 ||  || — || February 23, 2007 || Kitt Peak || Spacewatch || EOS || align=right | 2.1 km || 
|-id=160 bgcolor=#d6d6d6
| 442160 ||  || — || October 9, 2010 || Catalina || CSS || — || align=right | 3.4 km || 
|-id=161 bgcolor=#d6d6d6
| 442161 ||  || — || August 21, 2004 || Kitt Peak || Spacewatch || — || align=right | 3.0 km || 
|-id=162 bgcolor=#d6d6d6
| 442162 ||  || — || September 30, 2005 || Mount Lemmon || Mount Lemmon Survey || EOS || align=right | 1.9 km || 
|-id=163 bgcolor=#d6d6d6
| 442163 ||  || — || November 12, 2005 || Kitt Peak || Spacewatch || — || align=right | 2.3 km || 
|-id=164 bgcolor=#d6d6d6
| 442164 ||  || — || August 23, 2004 || Kitt Peak || Spacewatch || — || align=right | 2.9 km || 
|-id=165 bgcolor=#d6d6d6
| 442165 ||  || — || October 8, 2004 || Kitt Peak || Spacewatch || — || align=right | 2.2 km || 
|-id=166 bgcolor=#d6d6d6
| 442166 ||  || — || November 30, 2005 || Kitt Peak || Spacewatch || EOS || align=right | 2.0 km || 
|-id=167 bgcolor=#d6d6d6
| 442167 ||  || — || September 17, 2004 || Kitt Peak || Spacewatch || — || align=right | 2.3 km || 
|-id=168 bgcolor=#d6d6d6
| 442168 ||  || — || September 12, 2004 || Kitt Peak || Spacewatch || — || align=right | 2.9 km || 
|-id=169 bgcolor=#d6d6d6
| 442169 ||  || — || November 7, 2010 || Kitt Peak || Spacewatch || EOS || align=right | 2.0 km || 
|-id=170 bgcolor=#d6d6d6
| 442170 ||  || — || December 27, 2005 || Kitt Peak || Spacewatch || — || align=right | 3.3 km || 
|-id=171 bgcolor=#d6d6d6
| 442171 ||  || — || December 4, 2005 || Mount Lemmon || Mount Lemmon Survey || — || align=right | 2.8 km || 
|-id=172 bgcolor=#fefefe
| 442172 ||  || — || November 15, 2002 || Socorro || LINEAR || H || align=right data-sort-value="0.96" | 960 m || 
|-id=173 bgcolor=#C2FFFF
| 442173 ||  || — || November 28, 2010 || Mount Lemmon || Mount Lemmon Survey || L4 || align=right | 7.7 km || 
|-id=174 bgcolor=#d6d6d6
| 442174 ||  || — || November 3, 2004 || Kitt Peak || Spacewatch || — || align=right | 2.8 km || 
|-id=175 bgcolor=#d6d6d6
| 442175 ||  || — || May 2, 2003 || Kitt Peak || Spacewatch || EOS || align=right | 2.5 km || 
|-id=176 bgcolor=#d6d6d6
| 442176 ||  || — || October 3, 1999 || Kitt Peak || Spacewatch || — || align=right | 3.3 km || 
|-id=177 bgcolor=#FFC2E0
| 442177 ||  || — || December 7, 2010 || Mount Lemmon || Mount Lemmon Survey || AMOcritical || align=right data-sort-value="0.37" | 370 m || 
|-id=178 bgcolor=#d6d6d6
| 442178 ||  || — || January 22, 2006 || Catalina || CSS || — || align=right | 5.1 km || 
|-id=179 bgcolor=#d6d6d6
| 442179 ||  || — || December 28, 2005 || Kitt Peak || Spacewatch || — || align=right | 2.7 km || 
|-id=180 bgcolor=#d6d6d6
| 442180 ||  || — || February 25, 2006 || Catalina || CSS || — || align=right | 3.4 km || 
|-id=181 bgcolor=#fefefe
| 442181 ||  || — || January 3, 2011 || Catalina || CSS || H || align=right data-sort-value="0.79" | 790 m || 
|-id=182 bgcolor=#fefefe
| 442182 ||  || — || February 22, 2004 || Socorro || LINEAR || — || align=right | 1.2 km || 
|-id=183 bgcolor=#d6d6d6
| 442183 ||  || — || April 13, 2004 || Kitt Peak || Spacewatch || 3:2 || align=right | 3.4 km || 
|-id=184 bgcolor=#fefefe
| 442184 ||  || — || February 11, 2011 || Mount Lemmon || Mount Lemmon Survey || — || align=right data-sort-value="0.71" | 710 m || 
|-id=185 bgcolor=#fefefe
| 442185 ||  || — || September 25, 2009 || Kitt Peak || Spacewatch || — || align=right data-sort-value="0.62" | 620 m || 
|-id=186 bgcolor=#fefefe
| 442186 ||  || — || April 30, 2008 || Mount Lemmon || Mount Lemmon Survey || — || align=right data-sort-value="0.62" | 620 m || 
|-id=187 bgcolor=#fefefe
| 442187 ||  || — || November 22, 2006 || Kitt Peak || Spacewatch || — || align=right data-sort-value="0.77" | 770 m || 
|-id=188 bgcolor=#fefefe
| 442188 ||  || — || March 9, 2011 || Kitt Peak || Spacewatch || — || align=right data-sort-value="0.67" | 670 m || 
|-id=189 bgcolor=#fefefe
| 442189 ||  || — || January 8, 2011 || Mount Lemmon || Mount Lemmon Survey || NYS || align=right data-sort-value="0.69" | 690 m || 
|-id=190 bgcolor=#fefefe
| 442190 ||  || — || March 17, 2004 || Kitt Peak || Spacewatch || — || align=right data-sort-value="0.71" | 710 m || 
|-id=191 bgcolor=#fefefe
| 442191 ||  || — || March 11, 2011 || Kitt Peak || Spacewatch || — || align=right data-sort-value="0.78" | 780 m || 
|-id=192 bgcolor=#fefefe
| 442192 ||  || — || November 19, 2006 || Kitt Peak || Spacewatch || — || align=right data-sort-value="0.76" | 760 m || 
|-id=193 bgcolor=#fefefe
| 442193 ||  || — || September 15, 1996 || Kitt Peak || Spacewatch || — || align=right data-sort-value="0.65" | 650 m || 
|-id=194 bgcolor=#fefefe
| 442194 ||  || — || April 12, 2004 || Kitt Peak || Spacewatch || — || align=right data-sort-value="0.72" | 720 m || 
|-id=195 bgcolor=#fefefe
| 442195 ||  || — || March 7, 2007 || Mount Lemmon || Mount Lemmon Survey || — || align=right data-sort-value="0.69" | 690 m || 
|-id=196 bgcolor=#fefefe
| 442196 ||  || — || May 15, 2004 || Socorro || LINEAR || — || align=right data-sort-value="0.73" | 730 m || 
|-id=197 bgcolor=#fefefe
| 442197 ||  || — || October 16, 2009 || Mount Lemmon || Mount Lemmon Survey || — || align=right | 1.00 km || 
|-id=198 bgcolor=#fefefe
| 442198 ||  || — || October 28, 2005 || Kitt Peak || Spacewatch || — || align=right data-sort-value="0.68" | 680 m || 
|-id=199 bgcolor=#fefefe
| 442199 ||  || — || May 6, 2008 || Mount Lemmon || Mount Lemmon Survey || — || align=right data-sort-value="0.68" | 680 m || 
|-id=200 bgcolor=#fefefe
| 442200 ||  || — || January 30, 2004 || Kitt Peak || Spacewatch || — || align=right data-sort-value="0.73" | 730 m || 
|}

442201–442300 

|-bgcolor=#fefefe
| 442201 ||  || — || March 11, 2011 || Mount Lemmon || Mount Lemmon Survey || — || align=right data-sort-value="0.81" | 810 m || 
|-id=202 bgcolor=#fefefe
| 442202 ||  || — || April 1, 2011 || Kitt Peak || Spacewatch || — || align=right data-sort-value="0.71" | 710 m || 
|-id=203 bgcolor=#fefefe
| 442203 ||  || — || September 19, 2001 || Kitt Peak || Spacewatch || — || align=right data-sort-value="0.68" | 680 m || 
|-id=204 bgcolor=#fefefe
| 442204 ||  || — || February 12, 2004 || Kitt Peak || Spacewatch || — || align=right data-sort-value="0.46" | 460 m || 
|-id=205 bgcolor=#fefefe
| 442205 ||  || — || August 31, 2005 || Kitt Peak || Spacewatch || — || align=right data-sort-value="0.67" | 670 m || 
|-id=206 bgcolor=#fefefe
| 442206 ||  || — || March 26, 2011 || Mount Lemmon || Mount Lemmon Survey || — || align=right data-sort-value="0.86" | 860 m || 
|-id=207 bgcolor=#fefefe
| 442207 ||  || — || March 26, 2011 || Kitt Peak || Spacewatch || — || align=right data-sort-value="0.67" | 670 m || 
|-id=208 bgcolor=#fefefe
| 442208 ||  || — || April 11, 2011 || Mount Lemmon || Mount Lemmon Survey || — || align=right data-sort-value="0.69" | 690 m || 
|-id=209 bgcolor=#fefefe
| 442209 ||  || — || May 13, 2004 || Kitt Peak || Spacewatch || — || align=right data-sort-value="0.68" | 680 m || 
|-id=210 bgcolor=#fefefe
| 442210 ||  || — || March 27, 2011 || Mount Lemmon || Mount Lemmon Survey || — || align=right data-sort-value="0.91" | 910 m || 
|-id=211 bgcolor=#fefefe
| 442211 ||  || — || June 16, 2004 || Kitt Peak || Spacewatch || — || align=right data-sort-value="0.82" | 820 m || 
|-id=212 bgcolor=#fefefe
| 442212 ||  || — || February 6, 2007 || Mount Lemmon || Mount Lemmon Survey || — || align=right data-sort-value="0.68" | 680 m || 
|-id=213 bgcolor=#fefefe
| 442213 ||  || — || April 1, 2011 || Kitt Peak || Spacewatch || — || align=right data-sort-value="0.60" | 600 m || 
|-id=214 bgcolor=#fefefe
| 442214 ||  || — || February 17, 2007 || Mount Lemmon || Mount Lemmon Survey || NYS || align=right data-sort-value="0.58" | 580 m || 
|-id=215 bgcolor=#fefefe
| 442215 ||  || — || March 28, 2011 || Kitt Peak || Spacewatch || — || align=right data-sort-value="0.57" | 570 m || 
|-id=216 bgcolor=#fefefe
| 442216 ||  || — || April 22, 2011 || Kitt Peak || Spacewatch || — || align=right data-sort-value="0.64" | 640 m || 
|-id=217 bgcolor=#fefefe
| 442217 ||  || — || December 14, 2006 || Mount Lemmon || Mount Lemmon Survey || — || align=right data-sort-value="0.72" | 720 m || 
|-id=218 bgcolor=#fefefe
| 442218 ||  || — || April 1, 2011 || Kitt Peak || Spacewatch || — || align=right data-sort-value="0.78" | 780 m || 
|-id=219 bgcolor=#fefefe
| 442219 ||  || — || April 27, 2011 || Kitt Peak || Spacewatch || — || align=right data-sort-value="0.85" | 850 m || 
|-id=220 bgcolor=#fefefe
| 442220 ||  || — || April 24, 2011 || Kitt Peak || Spacewatch || — || align=right data-sort-value="0.80" | 800 m || 
|-id=221 bgcolor=#fefefe
| 442221 ||  || — || April 2, 2011 || Kitt Peak || Spacewatch || — || align=right data-sort-value="0.62" | 620 m || 
|-id=222 bgcolor=#fefefe
| 442222 ||  || — || April 5, 2011 || Mount Lemmon || Mount Lemmon Survey || — || align=right data-sort-value="0.75" | 750 m || 
|-id=223 bgcolor=#fefefe
| 442223 ||  || — || August 21, 2004 || Siding Spring || SSS || — || align=right data-sort-value="0.77" | 770 m || 
|-id=224 bgcolor=#fefefe
| 442224 ||  || — || April 21, 2004 || Kitt Peak || Spacewatch || — || align=right data-sort-value="0.65" | 650 m || 
|-id=225 bgcolor=#fefefe
| 442225 ||  || — || February 25, 2007 || Mount Lemmon || Mount Lemmon Survey || — || align=right data-sort-value="0.90" | 900 m || 
|-id=226 bgcolor=#fefefe
| 442226 ||  || — || November 25, 2005 || Mount Lemmon || Mount Lemmon Survey || — || align=right data-sort-value="0.82" | 820 m || 
|-id=227 bgcolor=#fefefe
| 442227 ||  || — || July 21, 2004 || Siding Spring || SSS || MAS || align=right data-sort-value="0.78" | 780 m || 
|-id=228 bgcolor=#fefefe
| 442228 ||  || — || March 20, 2007 || Mount Lemmon || Mount Lemmon Survey || — || align=right data-sort-value="0.86" | 860 m || 
|-id=229 bgcolor=#fefefe
| 442229 ||  || — || January 17, 2007 || Kitt Peak || Spacewatch || — || align=right data-sort-value="0.65" | 650 m || 
|-id=230 bgcolor=#fefefe
| 442230 ||  || — || February 21, 2007 || Kitt Peak || Spacewatch || NYS || align=right data-sort-value="0.54" | 540 m || 
|-id=231 bgcolor=#fefefe
| 442231 ||  || — || November 9, 2009 || Mount Lemmon || Mount Lemmon Survey || — || align=right data-sort-value="0.68" | 680 m || 
|-id=232 bgcolor=#fefefe
| 442232 ||  || — || June 9, 2007 || Kitt Peak || Spacewatch || — || align=right | 1.0 km || 
|-id=233 bgcolor=#fefefe
| 442233 ||  || — || June 6, 2011 || Mount Lemmon || Mount Lemmon Survey || V || align=right data-sort-value="0.76" | 760 m || 
|-id=234 bgcolor=#fefefe
| 442234 ||  || — || May 27, 2011 || Kitt Peak || Spacewatch || — || align=right data-sort-value="0.67" | 670 m || 
|-id=235 bgcolor=#fefefe
| 442235 ||  || — || December 10, 2009 || Mount Lemmon || Mount Lemmon Survey || — || align=right data-sort-value="0.72" | 720 m || 
|-id=236 bgcolor=#fefefe
| 442236 ||  || — || March 10, 2007 || Mount Lemmon || Mount Lemmon Survey || — || align=right data-sort-value="0.71" | 710 m || 
|-id=237 bgcolor=#E9E9E9
| 442237 ||  || — || October 15, 2007 || Mount Lemmon || Mount Lemmon Survey || — || align=right | 1.0 km || 
|-id=238 bgcolor=#E9E9E9
| 442238 ||  || — || June 7, 2011 || Catalina || CSS || — || align=right | 1.9 km || 
|-id=239 bgcolor=#fefefe
| 442239 ||  || — || March 31, 2011 || Mount Lemmon || Mount Lemmon Survey || NYS || align=right data-sort-value="0.65" | 650 m || 
|-id=240 bgcolor=#E9E9E9
| 442240 ||  || — || September 20, 1998 || Anderson Mesa || LONEOS || — || align=right | 1.6 km || 
|-id=241 bgcolor=#fefefe
| 442241 ||  || — || October 21, 2008 || Mount Lemmon || Mount Lemmon Survey || — || align=right | 1.1 km || 
|-id=242 bgcolor=#E9E9E9
| 442242 ||  || — || June 25, 2011 || Mount Lemmon || Mount Lemmon Survey || — || align=right | 2.3 km || 
|-id=243 bgcolor=#FFC2E0
| 442243 ||  || — || June 26, 2011 || Siding Spring || SSS || AMO +1km || align=right data-sort-value="0.86" | 860 m || 
|-id=244 bgcolor=#E9E9E9
| 442244 ||  || — || April 25, 2006 || Siding Spring || SSS || EUN || align=right | 1.1 km || 
|-id=245 bgcolor=#E9E9E9
| 442245 ||  || — || February 24, 2006 || Kitt Peak || Spacewatch || — || align=right | 1.0 km || 
|-id=246 bgcolor=#fefefe
| 442246 ||  || — || January 23, 2006 || Kitt Peak || Spacewatch || — || align=right | 1.4 km || 
|-id=247 bgcolor=#fefefe
| 442247 ||  || — || January 25, 2006 || Kitt Peak || Spacewatch || — || align=right data-sort-value="0.97" | 970 m || 
|-id=248 bgcolor=#fefefe
| 442248 ||  || — || June 26, 2011 || Mount Lemmon || Mount Lemmon Survey || NYS || align=right data-sort-value="0.76" | 760 m || 
|-id=249 bgcolor=#fefefe
| 442249 ||  || — || December 16, 2004 || Kitt Peak || Spacewatch || — || align=right data-sort-value="0.98" | 980 m || 
|-id=250 bgcolor=#E9E9E9
| 442250 ||  || — || February 13, 2010 || Catalina || CSS || — || align=right | 2.2 km || 
|-id=251 bgcolor=#fefefe
| 442251 ||  || — || December 30, 2008 || Mount Lemmon || Mount Lemmon Survey || — || align=right data-sort-value="0.94" | 940 m || 
|-id=252 bgcolor=#fefefe
| 442252 ||  || — || November 18, 2008 || Kitt Peak || Spacewatch || NYS || align=right data-sort-value="0.69" | 690 m || 
|-id=253 bgcolor=#FA8072
| 442253 ||  || — || October 3, 2003 || Kitt Peak || Spacewatch || — || align=right data-sort-value="0.49" | 490 m || 
|-id=254 bgcolor=#E9E9E9
| 442254 ||  || — || December 20, 2004 || Mount Lemmon || Mount Lemmon Survey || — || align=right | 1.6 km || 
|-id=255 bgcolor=#E9E9E9
| 442255 ||  || — || December 4, 2008 || Mount Lemmon || Mount Lemmon Survey || — || align=right | 3.0 km || 
|-id=256 bgcolor=#E9E9E9
| 442256 ||  || — || October 11, 2007 || Catalina || CSS || critical || align=right data-sort-value="0.65" | 650 m || 
|-id=257 bgcolor=#E9E9E9
| 442257 ||  || — || September 15, 2007 || Kitt Peak || Spacewatch || critical || align=right data-sort-value="0.82" | 820 m || 
|-id=258 bgcolor=#E9E9E9
| 442258 ||  || — || August 25, 1998 || Caussols || ODAS || — || align=right | 1.7 km || 
|-id=259 bgcolor=#E9E9E9
| 442259 ||  || — || November 21, 2008 || Kitt Peak || Spacewatch || MAR || align=right | 1.3 km || 
|-id=260 bgcolor=#E9E9E9
| 442260 ||  || — || September 3, 2007 || Mount Lemmon || Mount Lemmon Survey || — || align=right data-sort-value="0.71" | 710 m || 
|-id=261 bgcolor=#E9E9E9
| 442261 ||  || — || December 15, 2004 || Kitt Peak || Spacewatch || EUN || align=right | 1.7 km || 
|-id=262 bgcolor=#E9E9E9
| 442262 ||  || — || February 2, 2005 || Catalina || CSS || — || align=right | 1.2 km || 
|-id=263 bgcolor=#E9E9E9
| 442263 ||  || — || October 5, 2007 || Kitt Peak || Spacewatch || — || align=right | 1.2 km || 
|-id=264 bgcolor=#E9E9E9
| 442264 ||  || — || July 12, 2010 || WISE || WISE || — || align=right | 3.1 km || 
|-id=265 bgcolor=#fefefe
| 442265 ||  || — || September 14, 2007 || Mount Lemmon || Mount Lemmon Survey || — || align=right | 1.1 km || 
|-id=266 bgcolor=#E9E9E9
| 442266 ||  || — || September 14, 2007 || Mount Lemmon || Mount Lemmon Survey || — || align=right | 1.00 km || 
|-id=267 bgcolor=#E9E9E9
| 442267 ||  || — || September 3, 2007 || Catalina || CSS || — || align=right data-sort-value="0.74" | 740 m || 
|-id=268 bgcolor=#E9E9E9
| 442268 ||  || — || March 15, 2010 || Kitt Peak || Spacewatch || — || align=right | 1.7 km || 
|-id=269 bgcolor=#E9E9E9
| 442269 ||  || — || June 17, 2007 || Kitt Peak || Spacewatch || — || align=right | 1.1 km || 
|-id=270 bgcolor=#E9E9E9
| 442270 ||  || — || October 11, 2007 || Mount Lemmon || Mount Lemmon Survey || (5) || align=right data-sort-value="0.87" | 870 m || 
|-id=271 bgcolor=#d6d6d6
| 442271 ||  || — || December 4, 2007 || Mount Lemmon || Mount Lemmon Survey || — || align=right | 2.7 km || 
|-id=272 bgcolor=#E9E9E9
| 442272 ||  || — || February 17, 2010 || Kitt Peak || Spacewatch || — || align=right | 1.6 km || 
|-id=273 bgcolor=#fefefe
| 442273 ||  || — || November 11, 2004 || Kitt Peak || Spacewatch || — || align=right data-sort-value="0.79" | 790 m || 
|-id=274 bgcolor=#fefefe
| 442274 ||  || — || August 1, 2011 || Siding Spring || SSS || — || align=right | 1.1 km || 
|-id=275 bgcolor=#E9E9E9
| 442275 ||  || — || October 9, 2007 || Kitt Peak || Spacewatch || — || align=right | 1.2 km || 
|-id=276 bgcolor=#E9E9E9
| 442276 ||  || — || March 9, 2005 || Kitt Peak || Spacewatch || — || align=right data-sort-value="0.92" | 920 m || 
|-id=277 bgcolor=#d6d6d6
| 442277 ||  || — || September 28, 2000 || Socorro || LINEAR || — || align=right | 3.7 km || 
|-id=278 bgcolor=#fefefe
| 442278 ||  || — || August 8, 2007 || Socorro || LINEAR || — || align=right data-sort-value="0.86" | 860 m || 
|-id=279 bgcolor=#E9E9E9
| 442279 ||  || — || October 8, 2007 || Kitt Peak || Spacewatch || — || align=right | 1.4 km || 
|-id=280 bgcolor=#E9E9E9
| 442280 ||  || — || September 14, 2007 || Mount Lemmon || Mount Lemmon Survey || — || align=right | 1.2 km || 
|-id=281 bgcolor=#E9E9E9
| 442281 ||  || — || May 1, 2009 || Mount Lemmon || Mount Lemmon Survey || — || align=right | 2.7 km || 
|-id=282 bgcolor=#E9E9E9
| 442282 ||  || — || October 15, 2007 || Kitt Peak || Spacewatch || — || align=right | 1.3 km || 
|-id=283 bgcolor=#E9E9E9
| 442283 ||  || — || November 20, 2007 || Mount Lemmon || Mount Lemmon Survey || — || align=right | 1.8 km || 
|-id=284 bgcolor=#E9E9E9
| 442284 ||  || — || October 13, 2007 || Catalina || CSS || — || align=right | 1.1 km || 
|-id=285 bgcolor=#E9E9E9
| 442285 ||  || — || February 19, 2009 || Kitt Peak || Spacewatch || EUN || align=right | 1.1 km || 
|-id=286 bgcolor=#E9E9E9
| 442286 ||  || — || September 13, 2007 || Kitt Peak || Spacewatch || — || align=right data-sort-value="0.71" | 710 m || 
|-id=287 bgcolor=#E9E9E9
| 442287 ||  || — || February 26, 2009 || Kitt Peak || Spacewatch || — || align=right | 2.0 km || 
|-id=288 bgcolor=#E9E9E9
| 442288 ||  || — || April 7, 2005 || Kitt Peak || Spacewatch || — || align=right | 2.2 km || 
|-id=289 bgcolor=#E9E9E9
| 442289 ||  || — || November 7, 2007 || Catalina || CSS || — || align=right | 1.9 km || 
|-id=290 bgcolor=#fefefe
| 442290 ||  || — || December 11, 2004 || Kitt Peak || Spacewatch || — || align=right data-sort-value="0.98" | 980 m || 
|-id=291 bgcolor=#E9E9E9
| 442291 ||  || — || December 21, 2003 || Kitt Peak || Spacewatch || — || align=right | 1.5 km || 
|-id=292 bgcolor=#E9E9E9
| 442292 ||  || — || December 18, 2004 || Mount Lemmon || Mount Lemmon Survey || — || align=right | 1.3 km || 
|-id=293 bgcolor=#E9E9E9
| 442293 ||  || — || March 2, 2009 || Mount Lemmon || Mount Lemmon Survey || — || align=right | 1.5 km || 
|-id=294 bgcolor=#d6d6d6
| 442294 ||  || — || September 20, 2011 || Catalina || CSS || — || align=right | 2.9 km || 
|-id=295 bgcolor=#fefefe
| 442295 ||  || — || October 1, 2003 || Kitt Peak || Spacewatch || — || align=right data-sort-value="0.98" | 980 m || 
|-id=296 bgcolor=#E9E9E9
| 442296 ||  || — || October 20, 2007 || Mount Lemmon || Mount Lemmon Survey || (5) || align=right data-sort-value="0.66" | 660 m || 
|-id=297 bgcolor=#E9E9E9
| 442297 ||  || — || May 14, 2010 || Mount Lemmon || Mount Lemmon Survey || — || align=right | 1.5 km || 
|-id=298 bgcolor=#E9E9E9
| 442298 ||  || — || November 19, 2007 || Mount Lemmon || Mount Lemmon Survey || — || align=right | 2.8 km || 
|-id=299 bgcolor=#E9E9E9
| 442299 ||  || — || April 5, 2010 || Kitt Peak || Spacewatch || — || align=right data-sort-value="0.82" | 820 m || 
|-id=300 bgcolor=#E9E9E9
| 442300 ||  || — || October 13, 1998 || Kitt Peak || Spacewatch || — || align=right | 1.6 km || 
|}

442301–442400 

|-bgcolor=#d6d6d6
| 442301 ||  || — || January 11, 2008 || Kitt Peak || Spacewatch || — || align=right | 3.2 km || 
|-id=302 bgcolor=#d6d6d6
| 442302 ||  || — || September 13, 2005 || Kitt Peak || Spacewatch || — || align=right | 2.4 km || 
|-id=303 bgcolor=#E9E9E9
| 442303 ||  || — || September 23, 2011 || Mount Lemmon || Mount Lemmon Survey || (5) || align=right data-sort-value="0.78" | 780 m || 
|-id=304 bgcolor=#E9E9E9
| 442304 ||  || — || October 20, 2007 || Catalina || CSS || (5) || align=right data-sort-value="0.70" | 700 m || 
|-id=305 bgcolor=#E9E9E9
| 442305 ||  || — || September 20, 2007 || Catalina || CSS || — || align=right | 1.0 km || 
|-id=306 bgcolor=#E9E9E9
| 442306 ||  || — || October 25, 2003 || Kitt Peak || Spacewatch || EUN || align=right | 1.3 km || 
|-id=307 bgcolor=#E9E9E9
| 442307 ||  || — || September 22, 2011 || Kitt Peak || Spacewatch || — || align=right | 1.7 km || 
|-id=308 bgcolor=#E9E9E9
| 442308 ||  || — || May 5, 2010 || Mount Lemmon || Mount Lemmon Survey || — || align=right | 3.2 km || 
|-id=309 bgcolor=#E9E9E9
| 442309 ||  || — || July 3, 2010 || WISE || WISE || KON || align=right | 2.2 km || 
|-id=310 bgcolor=#E9E9E9
| 442310 ||  || — || October 6, 2007 || Kitt Peak || Spacewatch || — || align=right | 1.2 km || 
|-id=311 bgcolor=#E9E9E9
| 442311 ||  || — || March 15, 2010 || Mount Lemmon || Mount Lemmon Survey || EUN || align=right | 1.1 km || 
|-id=312 bgcolor=#E9E9E9
| 442312 ||  || — || August 11, 2002 || Socorro || LINEAR || EUN || align=right | 1.7 km || 
|-id=313 bgcolor=#E9E9E9
| 442313 ||  || — || September 20, 2011 || Kitt Peak || Spacewatch || — || align=right | 1.2 km || 
|-id=314 bgcolor=#E9E9E9
| 442314 ||  || — || November 5, 2007 || Kitt Peak || Spacewatch || — || align=right | 1.9 km || 
|-id=315 bgcolor=#E9E9E9
| 442315 ||  || — || October 16, 2007 || Catalina || CSS || — || align=right data-sort-value="0.78" | 780 m || 
|-id=316 bgcolor=#E9E9E9
| 442316 ||  || — || May 26, 2006 || Mount Lemmon || Mount Lemmon Survey || — || align=right | 2.4 km || 
|-id=317 bgcolor=#E9E9E9
| 442317 ||  || — || September 20, 2011 || Catalina || CSS || (1547) || align=right | 1.7 km || 
|-id=318 bgcolor=#d6d6d6
| 442318 ||  || — || June 19, 2010 || Mount Lemmon || Mount Lemmon Survey || — || align=right | 2.6 km || 
|-id=319 bgcolor=#E9E9E9
| 442319 ||  || — || October 11, 1977 || Palomar || PLS || — || align=right | 1.2 km || 
|-id=320 bgcolor=#E9E9E9
| 442320 ||  || — || September 20, 2011 || Kitt Peak || Spacewatch || HOF || align=right | 2.6 km || 
|-id=321 bgcolor=#E9E9E9
| 442321 ||  || — || July 17, 1998 || Caussols || ODAS || — || align=right | 1.2 km || 
|-id=322 bgcolor=#E9E9E9
| 442322 ||  || — || December 17, 2007 || Mount Lemmon || Mount Lemmon Survey || — || align=right | 1.8 km || 
|-id=323 bgcolor=#E9E9E9
| 442323 ||  || — || September 23, 2011 || Kitt Peak || Spacewatch || — || align=right | 2.0 km || 
|-id=324 bgcolor=#E9E9E9
| 442324 ||  || — || March 25, 2010 || Mount Lemmon || Mount Lemmon Survey || critical || align=right | 2.2 km || 
|-id=325 bgcolor=#E9E9E9
| 442325 ||  || — || November 7, 2007 || Kitt Peak || Spacewatch || — || align=right data-sort-value="0.94" | 940 m || 
|-id=326 bgcolor=#E9E9E9
| 442326 ||  || — || November 4, 2007 || Siding Spring || SSS || — || align=right | 1.8 km || 
|-id=327 bgcolor=#E9E9E9
| 442327 ||  || — || December 30, 2007 || Mount Lemmon || Mount Lemmon Survey || — || align=right | 2.3 km || 
|-id=328 bgcolor=#E9E9E9
| 442328 ||  || — || November 9, 2007 || Kitt Peak || Spacewatch || — || align=right | 1.2 km || 
|-id=329 bgcolor=#E9E9E9
| 442329 ||  || — || October 21, 2007 || Mount Lemmon || Mount Lemmon Survey || (5) || align=right data-sort-value="0.91" | 910 m || 
|-id=330 bgcolor=#E9E9E9
| 442330 ||  || — || September 23, 2011 || Kitt Peak || Spacewatch || — || align=right | 1.5 km || 
|-id=331 bgcolor=#E9E9E9
| 442331 ||  || — || May 13, 1996 || Kitt Peak || Spacewatch || — || align=right | 2.8 km || 
|-id=332 bgcolor=#E9E9E9
| 442332 ||  || — || September 26, 2011 || Kitt Peak || Spacewatch || NEM || align=right | 2.0 km || 
|-id=333 bgcolor=#E9E9E9
| 442333 ||  || — || September 25, 2007 || Mount Lemmon || Mount Lemmon Survey || (5) || align=right data-sort-value="0.76" | 760 m || 
|-id=334 bgcolor=#E9E9E9
| 442334 ||  || — || September 20, 2011 || Kitt Peak || Spacewatch || — || align=right | 1.1 km || 
|-id=335 bgcolor=#E9E9E9
| 442335 ||  || — || December 16, 2007 || Catalina || CSS || — || align=right | 1.6 km || 
|-id=336 bgcolor=#E9E9E9
| 442336 ||  || — || September 28, 2011 || Kitt Peak || Spacewatch || — || align=right | 1.2 km || 
|-id=337 bgcolor=#E9E9E9
| 442337 ||  || — || September 22, 2011 || Kitt Peak || Spacewatch || — || align=right | 1.3 km || 
|-id=338 bgcolor=#E9E9E9
| 442338 ||  || — || October 2, 1997 || Caussols || ODAS || — || align=right | 2.8 km || 
|-id=339 bgcolor=#E9E9E9
| 442339 ||  || — || September 26, 2011 || Kitt Peak || Spacewatch || — || align=right | 2.0 km || 
|-id=340 bgcolor=#E9E9E9
| 442340 ||  || — || May 11, 2005 || Mount Lemmon || Mount Lemmon Survey || — || align=right | 1.7 km || 
|-id=341 bgcolor=#E9E9E9
| 442341 ||  || — || November 5, 2007 || Mount Lemmon || Mount Lemmon Survey || — || align=right | 1.1 km || 
|-id=342 bgcolor=#E9E9E9
| 442342 ||  || — || September 14, 2007 || Mount Lemmon || Mount Lemmon Survey || EUN || align=right data-sort-value="0.89" | 890 m || 
|-id=343 bgcolor=#E9E9E9
| 442343 ||  || — || October 12, 2007 || Socorro || LINEAR || — || align=right | 1.2 km || 
|-id=344 bgcolor=#E9E9E9
| 442344 ||  || — || September 9, 2007 || Kitt Peak || Spacewatch || KON || align=right | 1.8 km || 
|-id=345 bgcolor=#fefefe
| 442345 ||  || — || October 12, 2007 || Mount Lemmon || Mount Lemmon Survey || NYS || align=right data-sort-value="0.67" | 670 m || 
|-id=346 bgcolor=#E9E9E9
| 442346 ||  || — || November 18, 2007 || Mount Lemmon || Mount Lemmon Survey || — || align=right | 1.1 km || 
|-id=347 bgcolor=#E9E9E9
| 442347 ||  || — || October 15, 2007 || Mount Lemmon || Mount Lemmon Survey || (5) || align=right data-sort-value="0.81" | 810 m || 
|-id=348 bgcolor=#E9E9E9
| 442348 ||  || — || January 1, 2009 || Kitt Peak || Spacewatch || MAR || align=right data-sort-value="0.84" | 840 m || 
|-id=349 bgcolor=#E9E9E9
| 442349 ||  || — || October 12, 2007 || Mount Lemmon || Mount Lemmon Survey || (5) || align=right data-sort-value="0.66" | 660 m || 
|-id=350 bgcolor=#d6d6d6
| 442350 ||  || — || September 28, 2011 || Mount Lemmon || Mount Lemmon Survey || — || align=right | 2.8 km || 
|-id=351 bgcolor=#E9E9E9
| 442351 ||  || — || November 5, 2007 || Kitt Peak || Spacewatch || (5) || align=right data-sort-value="0.66" | 660 m || 
|-id=352 bgcolor=#E9E9E9
| 442352 ||  || — || March 11, 2005 || Mount Lemmon || Mount Lemmon Survey || — || align=right | 1.7 km || 
|-id=353 bgcolor=#E9E9E9
| 442353 ||  || — || October 14, 1998 || Caussols || ODAS || — || align=right | 1.3 km || 
|-id=354 bgcolor=#E9E9E9
| 442354 ||  || — || October 14, 2007 || Catalina || CSS || EUN || align=right | 1.5 km || 
|-id=355 bgcolor=#E9E9E9
| 442355 ||  || — || September 8, 2011 || Kitt Peak || Spacewatch || — || align=right | 2.3 km || 
|-id=356 bgcolor=#E9E9E9
| 442356 ||  || — || October 14, 2007 || Mount Lemmon || Mount Lemmon Survey || (5) || align=right data-sort-value="0.64" | 640 m || 
|-id=357 bgcolor=#E9E9E9
| 442357 ||  || — || January 13, 2008 || Mount Lemmon || Mount Lemmon Survey || — || align=right | 2.0 km || 
|-id=358 bgcolor=#E9E9E9
| 442358 ||  || — || March 4, 2005 || Kitt Peak || Spacewatch || — || align=right | 1.8 km || 
|-id=359 bgcolor=#E9E9E9
| 442359 ||  || — || July 3, 2011 || Mount Lemmon || Mount Lemmon Survey || — || align=right | 1.7 km || 
|-id=360 bgcolor=#E9E9E9
| 442360 ||  || — || October 28, 1994 || Kitt Peak || Spacewatch || — || align=right data-sort-value="0.88" | 880 m || 
|-id=361 bgcolor=#E9E9E9
| 442361 ||  || — || February 3, 2000 || Kitt Peak || Spacewatch || — || align=right | 1.6 km || 
|-id=362 bgcolor=#E9E9E9
| 442362 ||  || — || January 17, 2004 || Kitt Peak || Spacewatch || — || align=right | 1.7 km || 
|-id=363 bgcolor=#E9E9E9
| 442363 ||  || — || October 20, 2007 || Mount Lemmon || Mount Lemmon Survey || RAFcritical || align=right data-sort-value="0.80" | 800 m || 
|-id=364 bgcolor=#E9E9E9
| 442364 ||  || — || January 13, 1996 || Kitt Peak || Spacewatch || — || align=right data-sort-value="0.65" | 650 m || 
|-id=365 bgcolor=#E9E9E9
| 442365 ||  || — || April 26, 2006 || Kitt Peak || Spacewatch || critical || align=right | 1.4 km || 
|-id=366 bgcolor=#E9E9E9
| 442366 ||  || — || November 18, 2007 || Mount Lemmon || Mount Lemmon Survey || — || align=right | 1.4 km || 
|-id=367 bgcolor=#E9E9E9
| 442367 ||  || — || September 14, 1998 || Kitt Peak || Spacewatch || — || align=right | 1.2 km || 
|-id=368 bgcolor=#E9E9E9
| 442368 ||  || — || September 12, 1998 || Kitt Peak || Spacewatch || — || align=right | 2.4 km || 
|-id=369 bgcolor=#E9E9E9
| 442369 ||  || — || December 31, 2007 || Kitt Peak || Spacewatch || — || align=right | 1.7 km || 
|-id=370 bgcolor=#E9E9E9
| 442370 ||  || — || September 26, 2011 || Kitt Peak || Spacewatch || — || align=right | 3.0 km || 
|-id=371 bgcolor=#fefefe
| 442371 ||  || — || November 12, 2004 || Catalina || CSS || — || align=right data-sort-value="0.91" | 910 m || 
|-id=372 bgcolor=#E9E9E9
| 442372 ||  || — || December 20, 2004 || Mount Lemmon || Mount Lemmon Survey || (5) || align=right | 1.0 km || 
|-id=373 bgcolor=#E9E9E9
| 442373 ||  || — || January 13, 2008 || Mount Lemmon || Mount Lemmon Survey || DOR || align=right | 2.5 km || 
|-id=374 bgcolor=#E9E9E9
| 442374 ||  || — || November 2, 2007 || Kitt Peak || Spacewatch || (5) || align=right data-sort-value="0.84" | 840 m || 
|-id=375 bgcolor=#E9E9E9
| 442375 ||  || — || November 9, 2007 || Kitt Peak || Spacewatch || — || align=right | 1.1 km || 
|-id=376 bgcolor=#E9E9E9
| 442376 ||  || — || February 16, 2004 || Kitt Peak || Spacewatch || — || align=right | 1.4 km || 
|-id=377 bgcolor=#E9E9E9
| 442377 ||  || — || December 3, 2007 || Kitt Peak || Spacewatch || — || align=right | 1.4 km || 
|-id=378 bgcolor=#E9E9E9
| 442378 ||  || — || December 4, 2007 || Mount Lemmon || Mount Lemmon Survey || — || align=right | 2.0 km || 
|-id=379 bgcolor=#E9E9E9
| 442379 ||  || — || May 4, 2005 || Mount Lemmon || Mount Lemmon Survey || — || align=right | 2.2 km || 
|-id=380 bgcolor=#E9E9E9
| 442380 ||  || — || January 19, 2008 || Mount Lemmon || Mount Lemmon Survey || — || align=right | 1.3 km || 
|-id=381 bgcolor=#E9E9E9
| 442381 ||  || — || April 30, 2006 || Kitt Peak || Spacewatch || — || align=right | 1.6 km || 
|-id=382 bgcolor=#E9E9E9
| 442382 ||  || — || September 21, 2011 || Kitt Peak || Spacewatch || — || align=right | 2.5 km || 
|-id=383 bgcolor=#E9E9E9
| 442383 ||  || — || December 18, 2007 || Mount Lemmon || Mount Lemmon Survey || AEO || align=right | 1.2 km || 
|-id=384 bgcolor=#d6d6d6
| 442384 ||  || — || January 12, 2008 || Kitt Peak || Spacewatch || — || align=right | 2.5 km || 
|-id=385 bgcolor=#E9E9E9
| 442385 ||  || — || July 25, 2006 || Mount Lemmon || Mount Lemmon Survey || — || align=right | 2.3 km || 
|-id=386 bgcolor=#E9E9E9
| 442386 ||  || — || September 29, 2011 || Kitt Peak || Spacewatch || MIS || align=right | 2.2 km || 
|-id=387 bgcolor=#E9E9E9
| 442387 ||  || — || April 24, 2009 || Mount Lemmon || Mount Lemmon Survey || — || align=right | 1.6 km || 
|-id=388 bgcolor=#E9E9E9
| 442388 ||  || — || December 18, 2003 || Kitt Peak || Spacewatch || — || align=right | 1.2 km || 
|-id=389 bgcolor=#E9E9E9
| 442389 ||  || — || October 17, 2011 || Kitt Peak || Spacewatch || — || align=right | 1.3 km || 
|-id=390 bgcolor=#E9E9E9
| 442390 ||  || — || October 18, 2011 || Mount Lemmon || Mount Lemmon Survey || — || align=right | 2.4 km || 
|-id=391 bgcolor=#E9E9E9
| 442391 ||  || — || November 7, 2002 || Kitt Peak || Spacewatch || — || align=right | 1.8 km || 
|-id=392 bgcolor=#E9E9E9
| 442392 ||  || — || April 30, 2006 || Kitt Peak || Spacewatch || — || align=right | 3.4 km || 
|-id=393 bgcolor=#E9E9E9
| 442393 ||  || — || September 20, 2011 || Kitt Peak || Spacewatch || EUN || align=right | 1.1 km || 
|-id=394 bgcolor=#E9E9E9
| 442394 ||  || — || September 21, 2011 || Kitt Peak || Spacewatch || — || align=right | 2.2 km || 
|-id=395 bgcolor=#E9E9E9
| 442395 ||  || — || September 21, 2011 || Kitt Peak || Spacewatch || — || align=right | 1.7 km || 
|-id=396 bgcolor=#E9E9E9
| 442396 ||  || — || September 18, 2006 || Catalina || CSS || — || align=right | 2.5 km || 
|-id=397 bgcolor=#E9E9E9
| 442397 ||  || — || August 28, 2006 || Kitt Peak || Spacewatch || AGN || align=right | 1.1 km || 
|-id=398 bgcolor=#E9E9E9
| 442398 ||  || — || October 18, 2011 || Kitt Peak || Spacewatch || — || align=right | 1.4 km || 
|-id=399 bgcolor=#E9E9E9
| 442399 ||  || — || January 13, 2008 || Mount Lemmon || Mount Lemmon Survey || — || align=right | 1.8 km || 
|-id=400 bgcolor=#E9E9E9
| 442400 ||  || — || December 30, 2007 || Mount Lemmon || Mount Lemmon Survey ||  || align=right | 1.8 km || 
|}

442401–442500 

|-bgcolor=#E9E9E9
| 442401 ||  || — || October 18, 2011 || Kitt Peak || Spacewatch || — || align=right | 2.0 km || 
|-id=402 bgcolor=#E9E9E9
| 442402 ||  || — || September 28, 2011 || Kitt Peak || Spacewatch || — || align=right | 1.4 km || 
|-id=403 bgcolor=#E9E9E9
| 442403 ||  || — || September 28, 2011 || Kitt Peak || Spacewatch || — || align=right | 1.8 km || 
|-id=404 bgcolor=#E9E9E9
| 442404 ||  || — || April 7, 2005 || Kitt Peak || Spacewatch || — || align=right | 1.5 km || 
|-id=405 bgcolor=#E9E9E9
| 442405 ||  || — || October 21, 2007 || Kitt Peak || Spacewatch || — || align=right data-sort-value="0.80" | 800 m || 
|-id=406 bgcolor=#E9E9E9
| 442406 ||  || — || March 17, 2009 || Kitt Peak || Spacewatch || — || align=right | 1.5 km || 
|-id=407 bgcolor=#E9E9E9
| 442407 ||  || — || December 4, 2007 || Mount Lemmon || Mount Lemmon Survey || — || align=right | 2.0 km || 
|-id=408 bgcolor=#E9E9E9
| 442408 ||  || — || August 21, 2006 || Kitt Peak || Spacewatch || — || align=right | 1.8 km || 
|-id=409 bgcolor=#d6d6d6
| 442409 ||  || — || September 30, 2006 || Mount Lemmon || Mount Lemmon Survey || — || align=right | 2.2 km || 
|-id=410 bgcolor=#d6d6d6
| 442410 ||  || — || October 21, 2011 || Mount Lemmon || Mount Lemmon Survey || — || align=right | 3.3 km || 
|-id=411 bgcolor=#d6d6d6
| 442411 ||  || — || October 20, 2011 || Kitt Peak || Spacewatch || — || align=right | 3.4 km || 
|-id=412 bgcolor=#E9E9E9
| 442412 ||  || — || September 28, 2006 || Kitt Peak || Spacewatch || — || align=right | 1.8 km || 
|-id=413 bgcolor=#E9E9E9
| 442413 ||  || — || September 22, 2011 || Kitt Peak || Spacewatch || — || align=right | 1.4 km || 
|-id=414 bgcolor=#E9E9E9
| 442414 ||  || — || October 18, 2011 || Catalina || CSS || — || align=right | 2.0 km || 
|-id=415 bgcolor=#E9E9E9
| 442415 ||  || — || October 23, 2011 || Socorro || LINEAR || — || align=right | 2.0 km || 
|-id=416 bgcolor=#E9E9E9
| 442416 ||  || — || October 1, 2011 || Kitt Peak || Spacewatch || — || align=right | 2.5 km || 
|-id=417 bgcolor=#d6d6d6
| 442417 ||  || — || April 28, 2010 || WISE || WISE || — || align=right | 3.7 km || 
|-id=418 bgcolor=#E9E9E9
| 442418 ||  || — || October 19, 2007 || Mount Lemmon || Mount Lemmon Survey || — || align=right | 1.2 km || 
|-id=419 bgcolor=#E9E9E9
| 442419 ||  || — || September 10, 2007 || Mount Lemmon || Mount Lemmon Survey || EUN || align=right data-sort-value="0.93" | 930 m || 
|-id=420 bgcolor=#E9E9E9
| 442420 ||  || — || September 30, 2011 || Kitt Peak || Spacewatch || — || align=right | 3.2 km || 
|-id=421 bgcolor=#E9E9E9
| 442421 ||  || — || March 27, 2000 || Kitt Peak || Spacewatch || — || align=right | 2.0 km || 
|-id=422 bgcolor=#E9E9E9
| 442422 ||  || — || September 23, 2011 || Kitt Peak || Spacewatch || MAR || align=right | 1.5 km || 
|-id=423 bgcolor=#E9E9E9
| 442423 ||  || — || October 20, 2011 || Kitt Peak || Spacewatch || WIT || align=right | 1.2 km || 
|-id=424 bgcolor=#E9E9E9
| 442424 ||  || — || December 16, 2007 || Mount Lemmon || Mount Lemmon Survey || — || align=right | 2.4 km || 
|-id=425 bgcolor=#E9E9E9
| 442425 ||  || — || April 1, 2005 || Kitt Peak || Spacewatch || MRX || align=right data-sort-value="0.98" | 980 m || 
|-id=426 bgcolor=#E9E9E9
| 442426 ||  || — || January 5, 2000 || Kitt Peak || Spacewatch || MAR || align=right | 1.2 km || 
|-id=427 bgcolor=#E9E9E9
| 442427 ||  || — || October 20, 2011 || Kitt Peak || Spacewatch || — || align=right data-sort-value="0.97" | 970 m || 
|-id=428 bgcolor=#E9E9E9
| 442428 ||  || — || September 28, 1998 || Kitt Peak || Spacewatch || MIS || align=right | 2.0 km || 
|-id=429 bgcolor=#E9E9E9
| 442429 ||  || — || August 21, 2006 || Kitt Peak || Spacewatch || — || align=right | 1.8 km || 
|-id=430 bgcolor=#E9E9E9
| 442430 ||  || — || January 15, 2008 || Mount Lemmon || Mount Lemmon Survey || — || align=right | 1.7 km || 
|-id=431 bgcolor=#E9E9E9
| 442431 ||  || — || December 4, 2007 || Mount Lemmon || Mount Lemmon Survey || — || align=right | 1.9 km || 
|-id=432 bgcolor=#E9E9E9
| 442432 ||  || — || September 15, 2006 || Kitt Peak || Spacewatch || — || align=right | 1.7 km || 
|-id=433 bgcolor=#d6d6d6
| 442433 ||  || — || November 21, 2005 || Catalina || CSS || — || align=right | 3.4 km || 
|-id=434 bgcolor=#E9E9E9
| 442434 ||  || — || October 3, 2002 || Socorro || LINEAR || — || align=right | 1.3 km || 
|-id=435 bgcolor=#E9E9E9
| 442435 ||  || — || October 10, 2007 || Mount Lemmon || Mount Lemmon Survey || EUN || align=right | 1.0 km || 
|-id=436 bgcolor=#d6d6d6
| 442436 ||  || — || February 13, 2008 || Kitt Peak || Spacewatch || — || align=right | 1.8 km || 
|-id=437 bgcolor=#E9E9E9
| 442437 ||  || — || November 5, 2007 || Mount Lemmon || Mount Lemmon Survey || — || align=right | 1.2 km || 
|-id=438 bgcolor=#d6d6d6
| 442438 ||  || — || November 25, 2005 || Kitt Peak || Spacewatch || Tj (2.95) || align=right | 4.0 km || 
|-id=439 bgcolor=#E9E9E9
| 442439 ||  || — || November 28, 1994 || Kitt Peak || Spacewatch || — || align=right | 1.6 km || 
|-id=440 bgcolor=#E9E9E9
| 442440 ||  || — || October 24, 2011 || Mount Lemmon || Mount Lemmon Survey || — || align=right | 1.8 km || 
|-id=441 bgcolor=#E9E9E9
| 442441 ||  || — || September 6, 2002 || Socorro || LINEAR || — || align=right | 1.3 km || 
|-id=442 bgcolor=#FA8072
| 442442 ||  || — || April 2, 2006 || Kitt Peak || Spacewatch || — || align=right | 1.6 km || 
|-id=443 bgcolor=#E9E9E9
| 442443 ||  || — || November 2, 2007 || Mount Lemmon || Mount Lemmon Survey || — || align=right data-sort-value="0.97" | 970 m || 
|-id=444 bgcolor=#E9E9E9
| 442444 ||  || — || November 2, 2007 || Kitt Peak || Spacewatch || (5) || align=right data-sort-value="0.73" | 730 m || 
|-id=445 bgcolor=#E9E9E9
| 442445 ||  || — || November 4, 2007 || Kitt Peak || Spacewatch || (5) || align=right data-sort-value="0.93" | 930 m || 
|-id=446 bgcolor=#d6d6d6
| 442446 ||  || — || March 1, 2008 || Kitt Peak || Spacewatch || — || align=right | 3.1 km || 
|-id=447 bgcolor=#d6d6d6
| 442447 ||  || — || November 15, 2006 || Kitt Peak || Spacewatch || EOS || align=right | 1.8 km || 
|-id=448 bgcolor=#E9E9E9
| 442448 ||  || — || September 26, 2011 || Kitt Peak || Spacewatch || — || align=right | 2.3 km || 
|-id=449 bgcolor=#E9E9E9
| 442449 ||  || — || May 16, 2010 || Mount Lemmon || Mount Lemmon Survey || — || align=right | 2.5 km || 
|-id=450 bgcolor=#d6d6d6
| 442450 ||  || — || September 26, 2006 || Kitt Peak || Spacewatch || KOR || align=right data-sort-value="0.98" | 980 m || 
|-id=451 bgcolor=#E9E9E9
| 442451 ||  || — || September 21, 2011 || Kitt Peak || Spacewatch || — || align=right | 1.1 km || 
|-id=452 bgcolor=#E9E9E9
| 442452 ||  || — || March 2, 2009 || Mount Lemmon || Mount Lemmon Survey || — || align=right | 1.3 km || 
|-id=453 bgcolor=#E9E9E9
| 442453 ||  || — || October 19, 2011 || Kitt Peak || Spacewatch || — || align=right | 2.0 km || 
|-id=454 bgcolor=#d6d6d6
| 442454 ||  || — || November 11, 2006 || Kitt Peak || Spacewatch || — || align=right | 1.9 km || 
|-id=455 bgcolor=#E9E9E9
| 442455 ||  || — || October 26, 1994 || Kitt Peak || Spacewatch || — || align=right data-sort-value="0.99" | 990 m || 
|-id=456 bgcolor=#E9E9E9
| 442456 ||  || — || March 23, 2004 || Socorro || LINEAR || — || align=right | 3.2 km || 
|-id=457 bgcolor=#E9E9E9
| 442457 ||  || — || November 2, 2007 || Kitt Peak || Spacewatch || (5) || align=right data-sort-value="0.85" | 850 m || 
|-id=458 bgcolor=#E9E9E9
| 442458 ||  || — || September 21, 2011 || Mount Lemmon || Mount Lemmon Survey || GEF || align=right | 1.1 km || 
|-id=459 bgcolor=#E9E9E9
| 442459 ||  || — || November 7, 2007 || Catalina || CSS || — || align=right | 1.8 km || 
|-id=460 bgcolor=#E9E9E9
| 442460 ||  || — || October 18, 2011 || Catalina || CSS || — || align=right | 2.1 km || 
|-id=461 bgcolor=#E9E9E9
| 442461 ||  || — || October 21, 2011 || Mount Lemmon || Mount Lemmon Survey || — || align=right data-sort-value="0.99" | 990 m || 
|-id=462 bgcolor=#E9E9E9
| 442462 ||  || — || September 29, 2011 || Mount Lemmon || Mount Lemmon Survey || — || align=right | 2.4 km || 
|-id=463 bgcolor=#E9E9E9
| 442463 ||  || — || December 4, 2007 || Mount Lemmon || Mount Lemmon Survey || — || align=right | 1.9 km || 
|-id=464 bgcolor=#E9E9E9
| 442464 ||  || — || February 4, 2000 || Kitt Peak || Spacewatch || — || align=right | 1.2 km || 
|-id=465 bgcolor=#d6d6d6
| 442465 ||  || — || September 29, 2005 || Siding Spring || SSS || — || align=right | 5.4 km || 
|-id=466 bgcolor=#d6d6d6
| 442466 ||  || — || February 20, 2009 || Kitt Peak || Spacewatch || KOR || align=right | 1.3 km || 
|-id=467 bgcolor=#E9E9E9
| 442467 ||  || — || November 8, 2007 || Mount Lemmon || Mount Lemmon Survey || — || align=right | 1.3 km || 
|-id=468 bgcolor=#E9E9E9
| 442468 ||  || — || September 23, 2011 || Kitt Peak || Spacewatch || — || align=right | 2.2 km || 
|-id=469 bgcolor=#d6d6d6
| 442469 ||  || — || September 30, 2006 || Mount Lemmon || Mount Lemmon Survey || KOR || align=right | 1.4 km || 
|-id=470 bgcolor=#d6d6d6
| 442470 ||  || — || October 21, 2011 || Kitt Peak || Spacewatch || EOS || align=right | 1.9 km || 
|-id=471 bgcolor=#d6d6d6
| 442471 ||  || — || December 17, 2006 || Mount Lemmon || Mount Lemmon Survey || EOS || align=right | 1.7 km || 
|-id=472 bgcolor=#E9E9E9
| 442472 ||  || — || April 20, 2009 || Kitt Peak || Spacewatch || HOF || align=right | 2.4 km || 
|-id=473 bgcolor=#d6d6d6
| 442473 ||  || — || June 22, 2010 || Mount Lemmon || Mount Lemmon Survey || — || align=right | 3.9 km || 
|-id=474 bgcolor=#E9E9E9
| 442474 ||  || — || August 28, 2006 || Kitt Peak || Spacewatch || — || align=right | 1.6 km || 
|-id=475 bgcolor=#E9E9E9
| 442475 ||  || — || September 24, 2011 || Catalina || CSS || — || align=right | 2.0 km || 
|-id=476 bgcolor=#E9E9E9
| 442476 ||  || — || January 11, 2008 || Catalina || CSS || — || align=right | 2.9 km || 
|-id=477 bgcolor=#d6d6d6
| 442477 ||  || — || October 21, 2006 || Mount Lemmon || Mount Lemmon Survey || — || align=right | 2.0 km || 
|-id=478 bgcolor=#E9E9E9
| 442478 ||  || — || March 3, 2009 || Kitt Peak || Spacewatch || — || align=right | 2.1 km || 
|-id=479 bgcolor=#E9E9E9
| 442479 ||  || — || October 24, 2011 || Catalina || CSS || — || align=right | 2.9 km || 
|-id=480 bgcolor=#E9E9E9
| 442480 ||  || — || September 18, 2007 || Mount Lemmon || Mount Lemmon Survey || — || align=right | 2.5 km || 
|-id=481 bgcolor=#E9E9E9
| 442481 ||  || — || December 3, 2007 || Kitt Peak || Spacewatch || — || align=right | 1.8 km || 
|-id=482 bgcolor=#d6d6d6
| 442482 ||  || — || September 8, 2000 || Kitt Peak || Spacewatch || EOS || align=right | 1.9 km || 
|-id=483 bgcolor=#E9E9E9
| 442483 ||  || — || November 2, 2007 || Mount Lemmon || Mount Lemmon Survey || — || align=right | 2.2 km || 
|-id=484 bgcolor=#d6d6d6
| 442484 ||  || — || October 21, 2011 || Mount Lemmon || Mount Lemmon Survey || — || align=right | 3.0 km || 
|-id=485 bgcolor=#E9E9E9
| 442485 ||  || — || September 25, 2006 || Kitt Peak || Spacewatch || AGN || align=right | 1.1 km || 
|-id=486 bgcolor=#E9E9E9
| 442486 ||  || — || September 27, 2006 || Catalina || CSS || — || align=right | 3.0 km || 
|-id=487 bgcolor=#E9E9E9
| 442487 ||  || — || September 23, 2011 || Catalina || CSS || — || align=right | 1.8 km || 
|-id=488 bgcolor=#E9E9E9
| 442488 ||  || — || November 5, 2007 || Mount Lemmon || Mount Lemmon Survey || EUN || align=right | 1.2 km || 
|-id=489 bgcolor=#E9E9E9
| 442489 ||  || — || October 18, 2003 || Kitt Peak || Spacewatch || — || align=right data-sort-value="0.99" | 990 m || 
|-id=490 bgcolor=#E9E9E9
| 442490 ||  || — || September 30, 2011 || Kitt Peak || Spacewatch || — || align=right | 2.0 km || 
|-id=491 bgcolor=#E9E9E9
| 442491 ||  || — || May 24, 2000 || Kitt Peak || Spacewatch || — || align=right | 2.9 km || 
|-id=492 bgcolor=#E9E9E9
| 442492 ||  || — || July 3, 2011 || Mount Lemmon || Mount Lemmon Survey || — || align=right | 1.9 km || 
|-id=493 bgcolor=#E9E9E9
| 442493 ||  || — || May 8, 2006 || Kitt Peak || Spacewatch || — || align=right | 2.5 km || 
|-id=494 bgcolor=#d6d6d6
| 442494 ||  || — || October 21, 2011 || Mount Lemmon || Mount Lemmon Survey || EOS || align=right | 1.6 km || 
|-id=495 bgcolor=#E9E9E9
| 442495 ||  || — || July 26, 2006 || Siding Spring || SSS || — || align=right | 2.3 km || 
|-id=496 bgcolor=#E9E9E9
| 442496 ||  || — || April 19, 2009 || Mount Lemmon || Mount Lemmon Survey || — || align=right | 1.9 km || 
|-id=497 bgcolor=#E9E9E9
| 442497 ||  || — || October 18, 2011 || Kitt Peak || Spacewatch || — || align=right | 1.5 km || 
|-id=498 bgcolor=#E9E9E9
| 442498 ||  || — || September 17, 2006 || Kitt Peak || Spacewatch || — || align=right | 2.1 km || 
|-id=499 bgcolor=#E9E9E9
| 442499 ||  || — || November 8, 2007 || Kitt Peak || Spacewatch || — || align=right | 1.4 km || 
|-id=500 bgcolor=#d6d6d6
| 442500 ||  || — || April 6, 2008 || Mount Lemmon || Mount Lemmon Survey || ULA7:4 || align=right | 4.6 km || 
|}

442501–442600 

|-bgcolor=#d6d6d6
| 442501 ||  || — || November 3, 2011 || Kitt Peak || Spacewatch || — || align=right | 2.3 km || 
|-id=502 bgcolor=#E9E9E9
| 442502 ||  || — || September 23, 2006 || Kitt Peak || Spacewatch || — || align=right | 1.9 km || 
|-id=503 bgcolor=#E9E9E9
| 442503 ||  || — || November 16, 2011 || Kitt Peak || Spacewatch || — || align=right | 2.1 km || 
|-id=504 bgcolor=#d6d6d6
| 442504 ||  || — || November 17, 2011 || Mount Lemmon || Mount Lemmon Survey || — || align=right | 2.8 km || 
|-id=505 bgcolor=#E9E9E9
| 442505 ||  || — || October 11, 2006 || Kitt Peak || Spacewatch || WIT || align=right data-sort-value="0.99" | 990 m || 
|-id=506 bgcolor=#d6d6d6
| 442506 ||  || — || November 20, 2006 || Kitt Peak || Spacewatch || — || align=right | 2.0 km || 
|-id=507 bgcolor=#d6d6d6
| 442507 ||  || — || September 22, 2001 || Kitt Peak || Spacewatch || — || align=right | 1.7 km || 
|-id=508 bgcolor=#E9E9E9
| 442508 ||  || — || October 27, 2011 || Catalina || CSS || EUN || align=right | 1.3 km || 
|-id=509 bgcolor=#E9E9E9
| 442509 ||  || — || December 5, 2007 || Kitt Peak || Spacewatch || — || align=right | 1.5 km || 
|-id=510 bgcolor=#d6d6d6
| 442510 ||  || — || September 26, 2006 || Mount Lemmon || Mount Lemmon Survey || — || align=right | 1.9 km || 
|-id=511 bgcolor=#E9E9E9
| 442511 ||  || — || December 14, 2007 || Mount Lemmon || Mount Lemmon Survey || — || align=right | 1.6 km || 
|-id=512 bgcolor=#d6d6d6
| 442512 ||  || — || June 24, 2010 || WISE || WISE || — || align=right | 3.2 km || 
|-id=513 bgcolor=#E9E9E9
| 442513 ||  || — || December 19, 2007 || Mount Lemmon || Mount Lemmon Survey || — || align=right | 1.3 km || 
|-id=514 bgcolor=#E9E9E9
| 442514 ||  || — || September 16, 2006 || Catalina || CSS || — || align=right | 2.5 km || 
|-id=515 bgcolor=#E9E9E9
| 442515 ||  || — || January 18, 2008 || Mount Lemmon || Mount Lemmon Survey || — || align=right | 1.0 km || 
|-id=516 bgcolor=#d6d6d6
| 442516 ||  || — || October 23, 2011 || Kitt Peak || Spacewatch || EOS || align=right | 1.9 km || 
|-id=517 bgcolor=#d6d6d6
| 442517 ||  || — || May 8, 2010 || WISE || WISE || — || align=right | 3.1 km || 
|-id=518 bgcolor=#E9E9E9
| 442518 ||  || — || February 8, 2008 || Kitt Peak || Spacewatch || AGN || align=right | 1.2 km || 
|-id=519 bgcolor=#d6d6d6
| 442519 ||  || — || December 14, 2006 || Kitt Peak || Spacewatch || — || align=right | 1.7 km || 
|-id=520 bgcolor=#d6d6d6
| 442520 ||  || — || December 13, 2006 || Mount Lemmon || Mount Lemmon Survey || — || align=right | 2.1 km || 
|-id=521 bgcolor=#E9E9E9
| 442521 ||  || — || December 11, 2002 || Socorro || LINEAR || CLO || align=right | 2.5 km || 
|-id=522 bgcolor=#E9E9E9
| 442522 ||  || — || December 6, 2002 || Socorro || LINEAR || — || align=right | 1.8 km || 
|-id=523 bgcolor=#FFC2E0
| 442523 ||  || — || November 30, 2011 || Kitt Peak || Spacewatch || APOPHA || align=right data-sort-value="0.45" | 450 m || 
|-id=524 bgcolor=#d6d6d6
| 442524 ||  || — || November 18, 2011 || Kitt Peak || Spacewatch || EOS || align=right | 2.2 km || 
|-id=525 bgcolor=#d6d6d6
| 442525 ||  || — || October 1, 2011 || Mount Lemmon || Mount Lemmon Survey || — || align=right | 3.1 km || 
|-id=526 bgcolor=#d6d6d6
| 442526 ||  || — || February 2, 2008 || Kitt Peak || Spacewatch || — || align=right | 2.6 km || 
|-id=527 bgcolor=#d6d6d6
| 442527 ||  || — || November 29, 2011 || Kitt Peak || Spacewatch || — || align=right | 2.8 km || 
|-id=528 bgcolor=#d6d6d6
| 442528 ||  || — || February 14, 2008 || Mount Lemmon || Mount Lemmon Survey || EOS || align=right | 1.9 km || 
|-id=529 bgcolor=#d6d6d6
| 442529 ||  || — || November 28, 2006 || Mount Lemmon || Mount Lemmon Survey || — || align=right | 2.5 km || 
|-id=530 bgcolor=#d6d6d6
| 442530 ||  || — || November 17, 2006 || Kitt Peak || Spacewatch || — || align=right | 2.7 km || 
|-id=531 bgcolor=#d6d6d6
| 442531 ||  || — || October 18, 2011 || Kitt Peak || Spacewatch || EOS || align=right | 1.7 km || 
|-id=532 bgcolor=#E9E9E9
| 442532 ||  || — || September 28, 2006 || Kitt Peak || Spacewatch || HOF || align=right | 2.3 km || 
|-id=533 bgcolor=#E9E9E9
| 442533 ||  || — || May 27, 2006 || Catalina || CSS || — || align=right | 2.1 km || 
|-id=534 bgcolor=#d6d6d6
| 442534 ||  || — || July 2, 2005 || Kitt Peak || Spacewatch || — || align=right | 2.3 km || 
|-id=535 bgcolor=#E9E9E9
| 442535 ||  || — || December 17, 2007 || Kitt Peak || Spacewatch || AGN || align=right data-sort-value="0.97" | 970 m || 
|-id=536 bgcolor=#E9E9E9
| 442536 ||  || — || August 26, 1998 || Kitt Peak || Spacewatch || — || align=right | 1.0 km || 
|-id=537 bgcolor=#d6d6d6
| 442537 ||  || — || January 27, 2007 || Kitt Peak || Spacewatch || — || align=right | 2.9 km || 
|-id=538 bgcolor=#E9E9E9
| 442538 ||  || — || April 9, 2010 || WISE || WISE || — || align=right | 2.6 km || 
|-id=539 bgcolor=#d6d6d6
| 442539 ||  || — || June 13, 2010 || WISE || WISE || — || align=right | 3.0 km || 
|-id=540 bgcolor=#d6d6d6
| 442540 ||  || — || May 10, 2010 || WISE || WISE || — || align=right | 2.4 km || 
|-id=541 bgcolor=#d6d6d6
| 442541 ||  || — || August 11, 2004 || Siding Spring || SSS || — || align=right | 4.0 km || 
|-id=542 bgcolor=#d6d6d6
| 442542 ||  || — || September 30, 2005 || Kitt Peak || Spacewatch || — || align=right | 2.4 km || 
|-id=543 bgcolor=#d6d6d6
| 442543 ||  || — || November 23, 2006 || Mount Lemmon || Mount Lemmon Survey || — || align=right | 3.7 km || 
|-id=544 bgcolor=#d6d6d6
| 442544 ||  || — || June 14, 2010 || WISE || WISE || — || align=right | 3.1 km || 
|-id=545 bgcolor=#d6d6d6
| 442545 ||  || — || November 4, 2010 || Mount Lemmon || Mount Lemmon Survey || — || align=right | 3.9 km || 
|-id=546 bgcolor=#d6d6d6
| 442546 ||  || — || December 5, 2005 || Kitt Peak || Spacewatch || — || align=right | 2.9 km || 
|-id=547 bgcolor=#fefefe
| 442547 ||  || — || June 17, 2010 || Catalina || CSS || — || align=right data-sort-value="0.80" | 800 m || 
|-id=548 bgcolor=#d6d6d6
| 442548 ||  || — || June 22, 2010 || WISE || WISE || — || align=right | 2.6 km || 
|-id=549 bgcolor=#d6d6d6
| 442549 ||  || — || December 6, 2005 || Kitt Peak || Spacewatch || — || align=right | 3.7 km || 
|-id=550 bgcolor=#d6d6d6
| 442550 ||  || — || January 24, 2007 || Mount Lemmon || Mount Lemmon Survey || — || align=right | 2.2 km || 
|-id=551 bgcolor=#d6d6d6
| 442551 ||  || — || July 12, 2010 || WISE || WISE || — || align=right | 2.9 km || 
|-id=552 bgcolor=#E9E9E9
| 442552 ||  || — || October 16, 2006 || Catalina || CSS || — || align=right | 2.3 km || 
|-id=553 bgcolor=#d6d6d6
| 442553 ||  || — || December 24, 2011 || Mount Lemmon || Mount Lemmon Survey || EOS || align=right | 1.9 km || 
|-id=554 bgcolor=#d6d6d6
| 442554 ||  || — || February 17, 2007 || Mount Lemmon || Mount Lemmon Survey || — || align=right | 3.0 km || 
|-id=555 bgcolor=#d6d6d6
| 442555 ||  || — || January 27, 2007 || Kitt Peak || Spacewatch || — || align=right | 2.5 km || 
|-id=556 bgcolor=#d6d6d6
| 442556 ||  || — || February 26, 2007 || Mount Lemmon || Mount Lemmon Survey || — || align=right | 3.1 km || 
|-id=557 bgcolor=#d6d6d6
| 442557 ||  || — || October 29, 2005 || Mount Lemmon || Mount Lemmon Survey || — || align=right | 2.7 km || 
|-id=558 bgcolor=#d6d6d6
| 442558 ||  || — || January 2, 2012 || Kitt Peak || Spacewatch || VER || align=right | 2.5 km || 
|-id=559 bgcolor=#FFC2E0
| 442559 ||  || — || January 11, 2012 || Mount Lemmon || Mount Lemmon Survey || AMO +1km || align=right data-sort-value="0.80" | 800 m || 
|-id=560 bgcolor=#d6d6d6
| 442560 ||  || — || December 3, 2000 || Kitt Peak || Spacewatch || — || align=right | 3.4 km || 
|-id=561 bgcolor=#d6d6d6
| 442561 ||  || — || August 25, 2004 || Kitt Peak || Spacewatch || — || align=right | 4.2 km || 
|-id=562 bgcolor=#d6d6d6
| 442562 ||  || — || December 4, 1999 || Kitt Peak || Spacewatch || — || align=right | 3.0 km || 
|-id=563 bgcolor=#d6d6d6
| 442563 ||  || — || February 16, 2001 || Anderson Mesa || LONEOS || — || align=right | 3.3 km || 
|-id=564 bgcolor=#E9E9E9
| 442564 ||  || — || December 5, 2002 || Socorro || LINEAR || — || align=right | 3.1 km || 
|-id=565 bgcolor=#d6d6d6
| 442565 ||  || — || October 30, 2010 || Mount Lemmon || Mount Lemmon Survey || 3:2 || align=right | 6.1 km || 
|-id=566 bgcolor=#d6d6d6
| 442566 ||  || — || December 30, 2011 || Kitt Peak || Spacewatch || — || align=right | 2.6 km || 
|-id=567 bgcolor=#d6d6d6
| 442567 ||  || — || September 10, 2004 || Socorro || LINEAR || — || align=right | 4.4 km || 
|-id=568 bgcolor=#d6d6d6
| 442568 ||  || — || November 11, 2010 || Catalina || CSS || — || align=right | 3.2 km || 
|-id=569 bgcolor=#d6d6d6
| 442569 ||  || — || October 29, 2005 || Catalina || CSS || EMA || align=right | 3.0 km || 
|-id=570 bgcolor=#d6d6d6
| 442570 ||  || — || July 15, 2010 || WISE || WISE || — || align=right | 2.9 km || 
|-id=571 bgcolor=#d6d6d6
| 442571 ||  || — || September 13, 2004 || Kitt Peak || Spacewatch || Tj (2.99) || align=right | 4.1 km || 
|-id=572 bgcolor=#d6d6d6
| 442572 ||  || — || December 17, 2006 || Mount Lemmon || Mount Lemmon Survey || — || align=right | 2.2 km || 
|-id=573 bgcolor=#d6d6d6
| 442573 ||  || — || February 8, 2007 || Kitt Peak || Spacewatch || — || align=right | 2.6 km || 
|-id=574 bgcolor=#d6d6d6
| 442574 ||  || — || February 20, 2002 || Kitt Peak || Spacewatch || — || align=right | 2.6 km || 
|-id=575 bgcolor=#d6d6d6
| 442575 ||  || — || February 19, 2001 || Socorro || LINEAR || TIR || align=right | 4.4 km || 
|-id=576 bgcolor=#d6d6d6
| 442576 ||  || — || December 10, 2005 || Kitt Peak || Spacewatch || — || align=right | 2.9 km || 
|-id=577 bgcolor=#d6d6d6
| 442577 ||  || — || November 30, 2005 || Kitt Peak || Spacewatch || THM || align=right | 2.0 km || 
|-id=578 bgcolor=#d6d6d6
| 442578 ||  || — || November 25, 2005 || Kitt Peak || Spacewatch || THM || align=right | 1.7 km || 
|-id=579 bgcolor=#d6d6d6
| 442579 ||  || — || July 23, 2010 || WISE || WISE || URS || align=right | 4.4 km || 
|-id=580 bgcolor=#d6d6d6
| 442580 ||  || — || August 12, 2010 || Kitt Peak || Spacewatch || — || align=right | 2.9 km || 
|-id=581 bgcolor=#d6d6d6
| 442581 ||  || — || July 19, 2010 || WISE || WISE || — || align=right | 2.1 km || 
|-id=582 bgcolor=#d6d6d6
| 442582 ||  || — || February 1, 2001 || Anderson Mesa || LONEOS || — || align=right | 3.1 km || 
|-id=583 bgcolor=#d6d6d6
| 442583 ||  || — || October 28, 2010 || Catalina || CSS || — || align=right | 4.0 km || 
|-id=584 bgcolor=#d6d6d6
| 442584 ||  || — || August 13, 2010 || WISE || WISE || Tj (2.98) || align=right | 4.0 km || 
|-id=585 bgcolor=#d6d6d6
| 442585 ||  || — || July 14, 2010 || WISE || WISE || — || align=right | 5.1 km || 
|-id=586 bgcolor=#FA8072
| 442586 ||  || — || January 12, 2008 || Catalina || CSS || — || align=right | 1.2 km || 
|-id=587 bgcolor=#d6d6d6
| 442587 ||  || — || March 16, 2007 || Mount Lemmon || Mount Lemmon Survey || — || align=right | 2.5 km || 
|-id=588 bgcolor=#d6d6d6
| 442588 ||  || — || September 14, 2004 || Anderson Mesa || LONEOS || EOS || align=right | 2.5 km || 
|-id=589 bgcolor=#d6d6d6
| 442589 ||  || — || August 6, 2010 || WISE || WISE || — || align=right | 4.8 km || 
|-id=590 bgcolor=#d6d6d6
| 442590 ||  || — || September 10, 2004 || Kitt Peak || Spacewatch || — || align=right | 2.6 km || 
|-id=591 bgcolor=#d6d6d6
| 442591 ||  || — || November 1, 2005 || Mount Lemmon || Mount Lemmon Survey || — || align=right | 2.7 km || 
|-id=592 bgcolor=#d6d6d6
| 442592 ||  || — || August 6, 2010 || WISE || WISE || — || align=right | 5.3 km || 
|-id=593 bgcolor=#d6d6d6
| 442593 ||  || — || September 15, 2004 || Kitt Peak || Spacewatch || — || align=right | 2.5 km || 
|-id=594 bgcolor=#d6d6d6
| 442594 ||  || — || January 10, 1999 || Kitt Peak || Spacewatch || 7:4 || align=right | 3.7 km || 
|-id=595 bgcolor=#d6d6d6
| 442595 ||  || — || October 13, 2010 || Mount Lemmon || Mount Lemmon Survey || — || align=right | 3.1 km || 
|-id=596 bgcolor=#d6d6d6
| 442596 ||  || — || November 11, 2010 || Kitt Peak || Spacewatch || — || align=right | 2.9 km || 
|-id=597 bgcolor=#d6d6d6
| 442597 ||  || — || August 8, 2010 || WISE || WISE || — || align=right | 3.2 km || 
|-id=598 bgcolor=#d6d6d6
| 442598 ||  || — || December 28, 2011 || Mount Lemmon || Mount Lemmon Survey || 7:4 || align=right | 4.3 km || 
|-id=599 bgcolor=#d6d6d6
| 442599 ||  || — || March 13, 2007 || Kitt Peak || Spacewatch || — || align=right | 4.3 km || 
|-id=600 bgcolor=#d6d6d6
| 442600 ||  || — || September 12, 2004 || Kitt Peak || Spacewatch || — || align=right | 3.0 km || 
|}

442601–442700 

|-bgcolor=#FA8072
| 442601 ||  || — || February 22, 2012 || Kitt Peak || Spacewatch || H || align=right data-sort-value="0.74" | 740 m || 
|-id=602 bgcolor=#d6d6d6
| 442602 ||  || — || June 26, 2010 || WISE || WISE || Tj (2.99) || align=right | 4.6 km || 
|-id=603 bgcolor=#d6d6d6
| 442603 ||  || — || March 23, 2004 || Kitt Peak || Spacewatch || 3:2 || align=right | 4.4 km || 
|-id=604 bgcolor=#fefefe
| 442604 ||  || — || December 30, 2008 || Mount Lemmon || Mount Lemmon Survey || H || align=right data-sort-value="0.81" | 810 m || 
|-id=605 bgcolor=#FFC2E0
| 442605 ||  || — || April 27, 2012 || Haleakala || Pan-STARRS || APOcritical || align=right data-sort-value="0.44" | 440 m || 
|-id=606 bgcolor=#fefefe
| 442606 ||  || — || November 29, 2005 || Mount Lemmon || Mount Lemmon Survey || H || align=right data-sort-value="0.53" | 530 m || 
|-id=607 bgcolor=#fefefe
| 442607 ||  || — || December 28, 2005 || Kitt Peak || Spacewatch || H || align=right data-sort-value="0.75" | 750 m || 
|-id=608 bgcolor=#fefefe
| 442608 ||  || — || December 4, 2008 || Kitt Peak || Spacewatch || H || align=right data-sort-value="0.66" | 660 m || 
|-id=609 bgcolor=#FFC2E0
| 442609 ||  || — || May 25, 2012 || Catalina || CSS || AMO +1km || align=right | 1.0 km || 
|-id=610 bgcolor=#fefefe
| 442610 ||  || — || September 5, 2007 || Siding Spring || SSS || H || align=right data-sort-value="0.82" | 820 m || 
|-id=611 bgcolor=#fefefe
| 442611 ||  || — || December 9, 2006 || Kitt Peak || Spacewatch || — || align=right data-sort-value="0.92" | 920 m || 
|-id=612 bgcolor=#fefefe
| 442612 ||  || — || August 10, 2012 || Kitt Peak || Spacewatch || — || align=right data-sort-value="0.76" | 760 m || 
|-id=613 bgcolor=#fefefe
| 442613 ||  || — || February 12, 2008 || Mount Lemmon || Mount Lemmon Survey || — || align=right data-sort-value="0.62" | 620 m || 
|-id=614 bgcolor=#fefefe
| 442614 ||  || — || December 26, 2005 || Mount Lemmon || Mount Lemmon Survey || MAS || align=right data-sort-value="0.81" | 810 m || 
|-id=615 bgcolor=#fefefe
| 442615 ||  || — || April 10, 2005 || Mount Lemmon || Mount Lemmon Survey || — || align=right data-sort-value="0.65" | 650 m || 
|-id=616 bgcolor=#fefefe
| 442616 ||  || — || January 28, 2007 || Kitt Peak || Spacewatch || — || align=right | 1.0 km || 
|-id=617 bgcolor=#fefefe
| 442617 ||  || — || November 17, 2009 || Kitt Peak || Spacewatch || — || align=right data-sort-value="0.94" | 940 m || 
|-id=618 bgcolor=#fefefe
| 442618 ||  || — || April 14, 2008 || Mount Lemmon || Mount Lemmon Survey || — || align=right data-sort-value="0.71" | 710 m || 
|-id=619 bgcolor=#fefefe
| 442619 ||  || — || December 4, 2005 || Mount Lemmon || Mount Lemmon Survey || — || align=right data-sort-value="0.81" | 810 m || 
|-id=620 bgcolor=#fefefe
| 442620 ||  || — || March 29, 2011 || Mount Lemmon || Mount Lemmon Survey || — || align=right data-sort-value="0.77" | 770 m || 
|-id=621 bgcolor=#fefefe
| 442621 ||  || — || April 9, 2008 || Kitt Peak || Spacewatch || — || align=right data-sort-value="0.52" | 520 m || 
|-id=622 bgcolor=#fefefe
| 442622 ||  || — || September 12, 2005 || Kitt Peak || Spacewatch || — || align=right data-sort-value="0.59" | 590 m || 
|-id=623 bgcolor=#fefefe
| 442623 ||  || — || August 31, 2005 || Kitt Peak || Spacewatch || — || align=right data-sort-value="0.65" | 650 m || 
|-id=624 bgcolor=#fefefe
| 442624 ||  || — || September 17, 2012 || Kitt Peak || Spacewatch || — || align=right data-sort-value="0.61" | 610 m || 
|-id=625 bgcolor=#fefefe
| 442625 ||  || — || February 22, 2011 || Kitt Peak || Spacewatch || — || align=right data-sort-value="0.71" | 710 m || 
|-id=626 bgcolor=#fefefe
| 442626 ||  || — || October 11, 1999 || Socorro || LINEAR || — || align=right data-sort-value="0.67" | 670 m || 
|-id=627 bgcolor=#fefefe
| 442627 ||  || — || November 8, 2009 || Mount Lemmon || Mount Lemmon Survey || — || align=right data-sort-value="0.57" | 570 m || 
|-id=628 bgcolor=#FA8072
| 442628 ||  || — || September 27, 2006 || Mount Lemmon || Mount Lemmon Survey || — || align=right data-sort-value="0.74" | 740 m || 
|-id=629 bgcolor=#fefefe
| 442629 ||  || — || October 31, 2005 || Kitt Peak || Spacewatch || — || align=right data-sort-value="0.57" | 570 m || 
|-id=630 bgcolor=#fefefe
| 442630 ||  || — || November 20, 2006 || Kitt Peak || Spacewatch || — || align=right data-sort-value="0.57" | 570 m || 
|-id=631 bgcolor=#fefefe
| 442631 ||  || — || September 25, 2012 || Catalina || CSS || — || align=right | 1.00 km || 
|-id=632 bgcolor=#fefefe
| 442632 ||  || — || September 15, 2012 || Kitt Peak || Spacewatch || — || align=right data-sort-value="0.77" | 770 m || 
|-id=633 bgcolor=#fefefe
| 442633 ||  || — || August 29, 2005 || Kitt Peak || Spacewatch || — || align=right data-sort-value="0.68" | 680 m || 
|-id=634 bgcolor=#fefefe
| 442634 ||  || — || January 29, 1995 || Kitt Peak || Spacewatch || — || align=right data-sort-value="0.81" | 810 m || 
|-id=635 bgcolor=#fefefe
| 442635 ||  || — || September 17, 2012 || Kitt Peak || Spacewatch || — || align=right data-sort-value="0.64" | 640 m || 
|-id=636 bgcolor=#fefefe
| 442636 ||  || — || October 8, 2012 || Mount Lemmon || Mount Lemmon Survey || — || align=right data-sort-value="0.87" | 870 m || 
|-id=637 bgcolor=#fefefe
| 442637 ||  || — || March 19, 2004 || Kitt Peak || Spacewatch || — || align=right data-sort-value="0.65" | 650 m || 
|-id=638 bgcolor=#fefefe
| 442638 ||  || — || July 11, 2005 || Kitt Peak || Spacewatch || — || align=right data-sort-value="0.78" | 780 m || 
|-id=639 bgcolor=#fefefe
| 442639 ||  || — || May 5, 2008 || Mount Lemmon || Mount Lemmon Survey || — || align=right data-sort-value="0.62" | 620 m || 
|-id=640 bgcolor=#fefefe
| 442640 ||  || — || November 21, 2009 || Mount Lemmon || Mount Lemmon Survey || — || align=right data-sort-value="0.78" | 780 m || 
|-id=641 bgcolor=#fefefe
| 442641 ||  || — || March 6, 2011 || Mount Lemmon || Mount Lemmon Survey || — || align=right data-sort-value="0.66" | 660 m || 
|-id=642 bgcolor=#fefefe
| 442642 ||  || — || September 4, 2008 || Kitt Peak || Spacewatch || — || align=right | 1.0 km || 
|-id=643 bgcolor=#fefefe
| 442643 ||  || — || November 17, 2009 || Mount Lemmon || Mount Lemmon Survey || — || align=right data-sort-value="0.81" | 810 m || 
|-id=644 bgcolor=#fefefe
| 442644 ||  || — || September 1, 2005 || Kitt Peak || Spacewatch || (1338) || align=right data-sort-value="0.58" | 580 m || 
|-id=645 bgcolor=#fefefe
| 442645 ||  || — || January 10, 2007 || Kitt Peak || Spacewatch || — || align=right data-sort-value="0.78" | 780 m || 
|-id=646 bgcolor=#fefefe
| 442646 ||  || — || February 17, 2007 || Mount Lemmon || Mount Lemmon Survey || — || align=right data-sort-value="0.70" | 700 m || 
|-id=647 bgcolor=#E9E9E9
| 442647 ||  || — || October 10, 2012 || Mount Lemmon || Mount Lemmon Survey || — || align=right | 1.3 km || 
|-id=648 bgcolor=#fefefe
| 442648 ||  || — || May 28, 2011 || Mount Lemmon || Mount Lemmon Survey || V || align=right data-sort-value="0.74" | 740 m || 
|-id=649 bgcolor=#FA8072
| 442649 ||  || — || November 10, 2009 || Kitt Peak || Spacewatch || — || align=right data-sort-value="0.73" | 730 m || 
|-id=650 bgcolor=#fefefe
| 442650 ||  || — || October 6, 2005 || Mount Lemmon || Mount Lemmon Survey || — || align=right data-sort-value="0.86" | 860 m || 
|-id=651 bgcolor=#fefefe
| 442651 ||  || — || January 30, 2004 || Kitt Peak || Spacewatch || — || align=right data-sort-value="0.74" | 740 m || 
|-id=652 bgcolor=#fefefe
| 442652 ||  || — || December 12, 2006 || Mount Lemmon || Mount Lemmon Survey || — || align=right data-sort-value="0.70" | 700 m || 
|-id=653 bgcolor=#fefefe
| 442653 ||  || — || January 27, 2007 || Mount Lemmon || Mount Lemmon Survey || — || align=right data-sort-value="0.57" | 570 m || 
|-id=654 bgcolor=#fefefe
| 442654 ||  || — || September 16, 2012 || Mount Lemmon || Mount Lemmon Survey || — || align=right data-sort-value="0.86" | 860 m || 
|-id=655 bgcolor=#fefefe
| 442655 ||  || — || September 14, 1999 || Kitt Peak || Spacewatch || — || align=right data-sort-value="0.58" | 580 m || 
|-id=656 bgcolor=#fefefe
| 442656 ||  || — || March 2, 2011 || Kitt Peak || Spacewatch || (2076) || align=right data-sort-value="0.72" | 720 m || 
|-id=657 bgcolor=#fefefe
| 442657 ||  || — || November 21, 2009 || Mount Lemmon || Mount Lemmon Survey || — || align=right data-sort-value="0.75" | 750 m || 
|-id=658 bgcolor=#fefefe
| 442658 ||  || — || June 3, 2008 || Mount Lemmon || Mount Lemmon Survey || — || align=right data-sort-value="0.68" | 680 m || 
|-id=659 bgcolor=#fefefe
| 442659 ||  || — || September 20, 2008 || Mount Lemmon || Mount Lemmon Survey || — || align=right data-sort-value="0.71" | 710 m || 
|-id=660 bgcolor=#fefefe
| 442660 ||  || — || September 18, 2001 || Kitt Peak || Spacewatch || — || align=right data-sort-value="0.64" | 640 m || 
|-id=661 bgcolor=#fefefe
| 442661 ||  || — || November 6, 2005 || Kitt Peak || Spacewatch || — || align=right data-sort-value="0.71" | 710 m || 
|-id=662 bgcolor=#E9E9E9
| 442662 ||  || — || October 11, 2012 || Kitt Peak || Spacewatch || — || align=right | 2.7 km || 
|-id=663 bgcolor=#fefefe
| 442663 ||  || — || September 30, 2005 || Anderson Mesa || LONEOS || — || align=right data-sort-value="0.86" | 860 m || 
|-id=664 bgcolor=#fefefe
| 442664 ||  || — || December 24, 2006 || Kitt Peak || Spacewatch || — || align=right data-sort-value="0.59" | 590 m || 
|-id=665 bgcolor=#fefefe
| 442665 ||  || — || September 24, 2005 || Anderson Mesa || LONEOS || — || align=right data-sort-value="0.90" | 900 m || 
|-id=666 bgcolor=#fefefe
| 442666 ||  || — || September 21, 2012 || Mount Lemmon || Mount Lemmon Survey || — || align=right data-sort-value="0.90" | 900 m || 
|-id=667 bgcolor=#fefefe
| 442667 ||  || — || December 10, 2009 || Mount Lemmon || Mount Lemmon Survey || — || align=right data-sort-value="0.79" | 790 m || 
|-id=668 bgcolor=#fefefe
| 442668 ||  || — || December 22, 2005 || Catalina || CSS || — || align=right data-sort-value="0.82" | 820 m || 
|-id=669 bgcolor=#fefefe
| 442669 ||  || — || October 1, 2005 || Mount Lemmon || Mount Lemmon Survey || — || align=right data-sort-value="0.68" | 680 m || 
|-id=670 bgcolor=#fefefe
| 442670 ||  || — || October 14, 2012 || Catalina || CSS || — || align=right data-sort-value="0.98" | 980 m || 
|-id=671 bgcolor=#fefefe
| 442671 ||  || — || January 23, 2006 || Mount Lemmon || Mount Lemmon Survey || — || align=right data-sort-value="0.70" | 700 m || 
|-id=672 bgcolor=#E9E9E9
| 442672 ||  || — || May 3, 2002 || Kitt Peak || Spacewatch || — || align=right | 1.7 km || 
|-id=673 bgcolor=#fefefe
| 442673 ||  || — || May 9, 2011 || Mount Lemmon || Mount Lemmon Survey || — || align=right data-sort-value="0.75" | 750 m || 
|-id=674 bgcolor=#fefefe
| 442674 ||  || — || October 8, 2012 || Mount Lemmon || Mount Lemmon Survey || — || align=right | 1.1 km || 
|-id=675 bgcolor=#fefefe
| 442675 ||  || — || December 18, 2009 || Mount Lemmon || Mount Lemmon Survey || — || align=right data-sort-value="0.68" | 680 m || 
|-id=676 bgcolor=#fefefe
| 442676 ||  || — || October 23, 2005 || Catalina || CSS || V || align=right data-sort-value="0.80" | 800 m || 
|-id=677 bgcolor=#fefefe
| 442677 ||  || — || August 30, 2005 || Kitt Peak || Spacewatch || — || align=right data-sort-value="0.79" | 790 m || 
|-id=678 bgcolor=#fefefe
| 442678 ||  || — || October 11, 2012 || Catalina || CSS || — || align=right | 1.1 km || 
|-id=679 bgcolor=#fefefe
| 442679 ||  || — || December 15, 2009 || Mount Lemmon || Mount Lemmon Survey || — || align=right data-sort-value="0.68" | 680 m || 
|-id=680 bgcolor=#E9E9E9
| 442680 ||  || — || April 17, 1998 || Kitt Peak || Spacewatch || — || align=right | 1.1 km || 
|-id=681 bgcolor=#fefefe
| 442681 ||  || — || August 31, 2005 || Kitt Peak || Spacewatch || — || align=right data-sort-value="0.62" | 620 m || 
|-id=682 bgcolor=#fefefe
| 442682 ||  || — || December 29, 2005 || Mount Lemmon || Mount Lemmon Survey || V || align=right data-sort-value="0.74" | 740 m || 
|-id=683 bgcolor=#fefefe
| 442683 ||  || — || October 17, 2012 || Kitt Peak || Spacewatch || — || align=right data-sort-value="0.79" | 790 m || 
|-id=684 bgcolor=#d6d6d6
| 442684 ||  || — || October 9, 2007 || Kitt Peak || Spacewatch || EOS || align=right | 1.9 km || 
|-id=685 bgcolor=#fefefe
| 442685 ||  || — || September 23, 2012 || Mount Lemmon || Mount Lemmon Survey || MAS || align=right data-sort-value="0.59" | 590 m || 
|-id=686 bgcolor=#fefefe
| 442686 ||  || — || November 3, 2005 || Mount Lemmon || Mount Lemmon Survey || — || align=right data-sort-value="0.86" | 860 m || 
|-id=687 bgcolor=#fefefe
| 442687 ||  || — || October 30, 2005 || Kitt Peak || Spacewatch || — || align=right data-sort-value="0.87" | 870 m || 
|-id=688 bgcolor=#E9E9E9
| 442688 ||  || — || September 27, 2008 || Mount Lemmon || Mount Lemmon Survey || (5) || align=right data-sort-value="0.72" | 720 m || 
|-id=689 bgcolor=#fefefe
| 442689 ||  || — || October 11, 2005 || Kitt Peak || Spacewatch || V || align=right data-sort-value="0.53" | 530 m || 
|-id=690 bgcolor=#fefefe
| 442690 ||  || — || October 1, 2005 || Kitt Peak || Spacewatch || — || align=right data-sort-value="0.71" | 710 m || 
|-id=691 bgcolor=#fefefe
| 442691 ||  || — || October 15, 2012 || Kitt Peak || Spacewatch || — || align=right data-sort-value="0.71" | 710 m || 
|-id=692 bgcolor=#d6d6d6
| 442692 ||  || — || April 8, 2010 || WISE || WISE || — || align=right | 4.3 km || 
|-id=693 bgcolor=#fefefe
| 442693 ||  || — || September 25, 2012 || Mount Lemmon || Mount Lemmon Survey || (883) || align=right data-sort-value="0.71" | 710 m || 
|-id=694 bgcolor=#fefefe
| 442694 ||  || — || December 10, 2005 || Kitt Peak || Spacewatch || — || align=right data-sort-value="0.66" | 660 m || 
|-id=695 bgcolor=#fefefe
| 442695 ||  || — || October 10, 1999 || Socorro || LINEAR || — || align=right data-sort-value="0.68" | 680 m || 
|-id=696 bgcolor=#fefefe
| 442696 ||  || — || October 3, 2002 || Socorro || LINEAR || — || align=right data-sort-value="0.73" | 730 m || 
|-id=697 bgcolor=#fefefe
| 442697 ||  || — || March 10, 2007 || Kitt Peak || Spacewatch || — || align=right data-sort-value="0.72" | 720 m || 
|-id=698 bgcolor=#fefefe
| 442698 ||  || — || March 11, 2011 || Mount Lemmon || Mount Lemmon Survey || — || align=right data-sort-value="0.82" | 820 m || 
|-id=699 bgcolor=#fefefe
| 442699 ||  || — || September 24, 2008 || Catalina || CSS || — || align=right | 1.1 km || 
|-id=700 bgcolor=#fefefe
| 442700 ||  || — || September 6, 2008 || Catalina || CSS || NYS || align=right data-sort-value="0.61" | 610 m || 
|}

442701–442800 

|-bgcolor=#fefefe
| 442701 ||  || — || August 24, 2008 || Kitt Peak || Spacewatch || — || align=right data-sort-value="0.77" | 770 m || 
|-id=702 bgcolor=#fefefe
| 442702 ||  || — || September 25, 2012 || Mount Lemmon || Mount Lemmon Survey || — || align=right data-sort-value="0.72" | 720 m || 
|-id=703 bgcolor=#fefefe
| 442703 ||  || — || September 30, 2005 || Mount Lemmon || Mount Lemmon Survey || — || align=right data-sort-value="0.73" | 730 m || 
|-id=704 bgcolor=#fefefe
| 442704 ||  || — || September 4, 2008 || Kitt Peak || Spacewatch || — || align=right data-sort-value="0.80" | 800 m || 
|-id=705 bgcolor=#E9E9E9
| 442705 ||  || — || November 20, 2004 || Kitt Peak || Spacewatch || — || align=right data-sort-value="0.90" | 900 m || 
|-id=706 bgcolor=#fefefe
| 442706 ||  || — || December 29, 2005 || Socorro || LINEAR || — || align=right data-sort-value="0.95" | 950 m || 
|-id=707 bgcolor=#fefefe
| 442707 ||  || — || September 21, 2012 || Mount Lemmon || Mount Lemmon Survey || — || align=right data-sort-value="0.86" | 860 m || 
|-id=708 bgcolor=#fefefe
| 442708 ||  || — || May 20, 2005 || Mount Lemmon || Mount Lemmon Survey || — || align=right data-sort-value="0.64" | 640 m || 
|-id=709 bgcolor=#fefefe
| 442709 ||  || — || June 8, 2008 || Kitt Peak || Spacewatch || (2076) || align=right data-sort-value="0.68" | 680 m || 
|-id=710 bgcolor=#fefefe
| 442710 ||  || — || September 21, 2012 || Kitt Peak || Spacewatch || — || align=right data-sort-value="0.85" | 850 m || 
|-id=711 bgcolor=#fefefe
| 442711 ||  || — || October 12, 2005 || Kitt Peak || Spacewatch || — || align=right data-sort-value="0.86" | 860 m || 
|-id=712 bgcolor=#fefefe
| 442712 ||  || — || January 7, 2010 || Kitt Peak || Spacewatch || — || align=right data-sort-value="0.75" | 750 m || 
|-id=713 bgcolor=#E9E9E9
| 442713 ||  || — || November 28, 1995 || Kitt Peak || Spacewatch || — || align=right | 1.5 km || 
|-id=714 bgcolor=#fefefe
| 442714 ||  || — || October 8, 2012 || Kitt Peak || Spacewatch || — || align=right data-sort-value="0.94" | 940 m || 
|-id=715 bgcolor=#FA8072
| 442715 ||  || — || October 26, 2009 || Mount Lemmon || Mount Lemmon Survey || — || align=right data-sort-value="0.78" | 780 m || 
|-id=716 bgcolor=#fefefe
| 442716 ||  || — || October 13, 2012 || Kitt Peak || Spacewatch || — || align=right data-sort-value="0.70" | 700 m || 
|-id=717 bgcolor=#d6d6d6
| 442717 ||  || — || January 26, 2003 || Anderson Mesa || LONEOS || — || align=right | 4.2 km || 
|-id=718 bgcolor=#E9E9E9
| 442718 ||  || — || November 19, 2003 || Kitt Peak || Spacewatch || — || align=right | 3.1 km || 
|-id=719 bgcolor=#fefefe
| 442719 ||  || — || September 23, 2005 || Kitt Peak || Spacewatch || — || align=right data-sort-value="0.71" | 710 m || 
|-id=720 bgcolor=#fefefe
| 442720 ||  || — || March 29, 2011 || Mount Lemmon || Mount Lemmon Survey || — || align=right data-sort-value="0.73" | 730 m || 
|-id=721 bgcolor=#FA8072
| 442721 Kerouac ||  ||  || October 18, 2009 || Mount Lemmon || Mount Lemmon Survey || — || align=right data-sort-value="0.69" | 690 m || 
|-id=722 bgcolor=#fefefe
| 442722 ||  || — || September 25, 2012 || Kitt Peak || Spacewatch || — || align=right | 1.0 km || 
|-id=723 bgcolor=#fefefe
| 442723 ||  || — || January 7, 2006 || Mount Lemmon || Mount Lemmon Survey || NYS || align=right data-sort-value="0.71" | 710 m || 
|-id=724 bgcolor=#fefefe
| 442724 ||  || — || January 12, 2010 || Kitt Peak || Spacewatch || — || align=right data-sort-value="0.73" | 730 m || 
|-id=725 bgcolor=#E9E9E9
| 442725 ||  || — || November 5, 2012 || Kitt Peak || Spacewatch || — || align=right | 1.3 km || 
|-id=726 bgcolor=#fefefe
| 442726 ||  || — || October 21, 2012 || Kitt Peak || Spacewatch || — || align=right data-sort-value="0.90" | 900 m || 
|-id=727 bgcolor=#fefefe
| 442727 ||  || — || October 8, 2012 || Kitt Peak || Spacewatch || — || align=right data-sort-value="0.84" | 840 m || 
|-id=728 bgcolor=#fefefe
| 442728 ||  || — || September 18, 2012 || Mount Lemmon || Mount Lemmon Survey || — || align=right data-sort-value="0.73" | 730 m || 
|-id=729 bgcolor=#fefefe
| 442729 ||  || — || September 24, 2008 || Mount Lemmon || Mount Lemmon Survey || — || align=right data-sort-value="0.89" | 890 m || 
|-id=730 bgcolor=#fefefe
| 442730 ||  || — || October 17, 1995 || Kitt Peak || Spacewatch || — || align=right data-sort-value="0.61" | 610 m || 
|-id=731 bgcolor=#E9E9E9
| 442731 ||  || — || October 23, 2003 || Kitt Peak || Spacewatch || — || align=right | 1.7 km || 
|-id=732 bgcolor=#fefefe
| 442732 ||  || — || October 4, 2005 || Catalina || CSS || (883) || align=right data-sort-value="0.89" | 890 m || 
|-id=733 bgcolor=#E9E9E9
| 442733 ||  || — || October 15, 2012 || Kitt Peak || Spacewatch || — || align=right | 1.3 km || 
|-id=734 bgcolor=#fefefe
| 442734 ||  || — || September 29, 2005 || Kitt Peak || Spacewatch || — || align=right data-sort-value="0.78" | 780 m || 
|-id=735 bgcolor=#fefefe
| 442735 ||  || — || September 5, 2008 || Kitt Peak || Spacewatch || V || align=right data-sort-value="0.69" | 690 m || 
|-id=736 bgcolor=#fefefe
| 442736 ||  || — || December 20, 2009 || Kitt Peak || Spacewatch || — || align=right data-sort-value="0.73" | 730 m || 
|-id=737 bgcolor=#fefefe
| 442737 ||  || — || September 26, 2005 || Catalina || CSS || — || align=right data-sort-value="0.94" | 940 m || 
|-id=738 bgcolor=#fefefe
| 442738 ||  || — || October 1, 1999 || Kitt Peak || Spacewatch || — || align=right data-sort-value="0.56" | 560 m || 
|-id=739 bgcolor=#fefefe
| 442739 ||  || — || April 29, 2008 || Kitt Peak || Spacewatch || — || align=right data-sort-value="0.68" | 680 m || 
|-id=740 bgcolor=#E9E9E9
| 442740 ||  || — || December 15, 2004 || Kitt Peak || Spacewatch || — || align=right | 1.3 km || 
|-id=741 bgcolor=#E9E9E9
| 442741 ||  || — || October 25, 2012 || Kitt Peak || Spacewatch || (5) || align=right data-sort-value="0.85" | 850 m || 
|-id=742 bgcolor=#FFC2E0
| 442742 ||  || — || March 22, 2010 || WISE || WISE || AMO +1kmslow || align=right | 2.3 km || 
|-id=743 bgcolor=#fefefe
| 442743 ||  || — || December 16, 1995 || Kitt Peak || Spacewatch || — || align=right data-sort-value="0.76" | 760 m || 
|-id=744 bgcolor=#fefefe
| 442744 ||  || — || July 2, 2008 || Kitt Peak || Spacewatch || — || align=right data-sort-value="0.71" | 710 m || 
|-id=745 bgcolor=#fefefe
| 442745 ||  || — || January 7, 2006 || Mount Lemmon || Mount Lemmon Survey || — || align=right data-sort-value="0.61" | 610 m || 
|-id=746 bgcolor=#fefefe
| 442746 ||  || — || November 19, 2012 || Kitt Peak || Spacewatch || — || align=right data-sort-value="0.83" | 830 m || 
|-id=747 bgcolor=#fefefe
| 442747 ||  || — || October 7, 2008 || Mount Lemmon || Mount Lemmon Survey || — || align=right data-sort-value="0.89" | 890 m || 
|-id=748 bgcolor=#E9E9E9
| 442748 ||  || — || October 19, 2012 || Mount Lemmon || Mount Lemmon Survey || — || align=right | 1.5 km || 
|-id=749 bgcolor=#fefefe
| 442749 ||  || — || September 25, 2008 || Kitt Peak || Spacewatch || — || align=right data-sort-value="0.60" | 600 m || 
|-id=750 bgcolor=#E9E9E9
| 442750 ||  || — || April 21, 2006 || Siding Spring || SSS || EUN || align=right | 1.7 km || 
|-id=751 bgcolor=#fefefe
| 442751 ||  || — || September 21, 2001 || Socorro || LINEAR || NYS || align=right data-sort-value="0.69" | 690 m || 
|-id=752 bgcolor=#E9E9E9
| 442752 ||  || — || January 20, 2009 || Catalina || CSS || — || align=right | 2.9 km || 
|-id=753 bgcolor=#E9E9E9
| 442753 ||  || — || November 2, 2008 || Mount Lemmon || Mount Lemmon Survey || EUN || align=right | 1.4 km || 
|-id=754 bgcolor=#fefefe
| 442754 ||  || — || September 9, 2008 || Kitt Peak || Spacewatch || — || align=right data-sort-value="0.78" | 780 m || 
|-id=755 bgcolor=#fefefe
| 442755 ||  || — || September 26, 2008 || Kitt Peak || Spacewatch || — || align=right data-sort-value="0.89" | 890 m || 
|-id=756 bgcolor=#fefefe
| 442756 ||  || — || November 26, 2005 || Mount Lemmon || Mount Lemmon Survey || — || align=right data-sort-value="0.96" | 960 m || 
|-id=757 bgcolor=#E9E9E9
| 442757 ||  || — || December 5, 2008 || Kitt Peak || Spacewatch || — || align=right data-sort-value="0.94" | 940 m || 
|-id=758 bgcolor=#fefefe
| 442758 ||  || — || June 30, 2008 || Kitt Peak || Spacewatch || V || align=right data-sort-value="0.71" | 710 m || 
|-id=759 bgcolor=#E9E9E9
| 442759 ||  || — || September 15, 2007 || Catalina || CSS || — || align=right | 2.5 km || 
|-id=760 bgcolor=#fefefe
| 442760 ||  || — || January 22, 2006 || Mount Lemmon || Mount Lemmon Survey || — || align=right data-sort-value="0.78" | 780 m || 
|-id=761 bgcolor=#fefefe
| 442761 ||  || — || September 29, 2008 || Mount Lemmon || Mount Lemmon Survey || — || align=right data-sort-value="0.93" | 930 m || 
|-id=762 bgcolor=#fefefe
| 442762 ||  || — || November 6, 2012 || Kitt Peak || Spacewatch || — || align=right | 1.2 km || 
|-id=763 bgcolor=#C2FFFF
| 442763 ||  || — || October 18, 2009 || Kitt Peak || Spacewatch || L4 || align=right | 8.7 km || 
|-id=764 bgcolor=#fefefe
| 442764 ||  || — || September 4, 2008 || Kitt Peak || Spacewatch || V || align=right data-sort-value="0.62" | 620 m || 
|-id=765 bgcolor=#E9E9E9
| 442765 ||  || — || July 2, 2011 || Mount Lemmon || Mount Lemmon Survey || — || align=right | 1.2 km || 
|-id=766 bgcolor=#E9E9E9
| 442766 ||  || — || December 31, 2008 || Mount Lemmon || Mount Lemmon Survey || (5) || align=right data-sort-value="0.78" | 780 m || 
|-id=767 bgcolor=#fefefe
| 442767 ||  || — || December 25, 2005 || Mount Lemmon || Mount Lemmon Survey || — || align=right data-sort-value="0.78" | 780 m || 
|-id=768 bgcolor=#fefefe
| 442768 ||  || — || December 30, 2005 || Kitt Peak || Spacewatch || — || align=right data-sort-value="0.65" | 650 m || 
|-id=769 bgcolor=#E9E9E9
| 442769 ||  || — || November 13, 2012 || Mount Lemmon || Mount Lemmon Survey || — || align=right | 1.9 km || 
|-id=770 bgcolor=#fefefe
| 442770 ||  || — || September 23, 2008 || Mount Lemmon || Mount Lemmon Survey || V || align=right data-sort-value="0.57" | 570 m || 
|-id=771 bgcolor=#fefefe
| 442771 ||  || — || October 16, 2012 || Kitt Peak || Spacewatch || — || align=right data-sort-value="0.61" | 610 m || 
|-id=772 bgcolor=#E9E9E9
| 442772 ||  || — || December 6, 2012 || Kitt Peak || Spacewatch || EUN || align=right | 1.3 km || 
|-id=773 bgcolor=#E9E9E9
| 442773 ||  || — || November 4, 2007 || Mount Lemmon || Mount Lemmon Survey || — || align=right | 2.2 km || 
|-id=774 bgcolor=#E9E9E9
| 442774 ||  || — || November 13, 2012 || Mount Lemmon || Mount Lemmon Survey || — || align=right | 2.8 km || 
|-id=775 bgcolor=#fefefe
| 442775 ||  || — || December 4, 2005 || Kitt Peak || Spacewatch || — || align=right data-sort-value="0.82" | 820 m || 
|-id=776 bgcolor=#fefefe
| 442776 ||  || — || January 20, 2006 || Catalina || CSS || — || align=right | 1.0 km || 
|-id=777 bgcolor=#E9E9E9
| 442777 ||  || — || December 8, 2012 || Kitt Peak || Spacewatch || GEF || align=right | 1.0 km || 
|-id=778 bgcolor=#E9E9E9
| 442778 ||  || — || November 26, 2012 || Mount Lemmon || Mount Lemmon Survey || — || align=right | 1.2 km || 
|-id=779 bgcolor=#fefefe
| 442779 ||  || — || January 31, 2006 || Kitt Peak || Spacewatch || V || align=right data-sort-value="0.64" | 640 m || 
|-id=780 bgcolor=#d6d6d6
| 442780 ||  || — || November 6, 2012 || Kitt Peak || Spacewatch || EOS || align=right | 2.1 km || 
|-id=781 bgcolor=#E9E9E9
| 442781 ||  || — || August 7, 1999 || Kitt Peak || Spacewatch || — || align=right | 1.1 km || 
|-id=782 bgcolor=#E9E9E9
| 442782 ||  || — || December 4, 2008 || Mount Lemmon || Mount Lemmon Survey || EUN || align=right | 1.0 km || 
|-id=783 bgcolor=#fefefe
| 442783 ||  || — || September 30, 2005 || Catalina || CSS || — || align=right data-sort-value="0.68" | 680 m || 
|-id=784 bgcolor=#fefefe
| 442784 ||  || — || October 20, 2001 || Socorro || LINEAR || — || align=right data-sort-value="0.62" | 620 m || 
|-id=785 bgcolor=#E9E9E9
| 442785 ||  || — || December 20, 1995 || Kitt Peak || Spacewatch || (5) || align=right | 1.1 km || 
|-id=786 bgcolor=#E9E9E9
| 442786 ||  || — || February 1, 2009 || Catalina || CSS || — || align=right | 1.9 km || 
|-id=787 bgcolor=#fefefe
| 442787 ||  || — || September 12, 2001 || Socorro || LINEAR || — || align=right data-sort-value="0.59" | 590 m || 
|-id=788 bgcolor=#E9E9E9
| 442788 ||  || — || December 8, 2012 || Kitt Peak || Spacewatch || — || align=right | 1.2 km || 
|-id=789 bgcolor=#fefefe
| 442789 ||  || — || November 1, 2008 || Mount Lemmon || Mount Lemmon Survey || — || align=right data-sort-value="0.78" | 780 m || 
|-id=790 bgcolor=#fefefe
| 442790 ||  || — || December 26, 2005 || Mount Lemmon || Mount Lemmon Survey || — || align=right data-sort-value="0.82" | 820 m || 
|-id=791 bgcolor=#E9E9E9
| 442791 ||  || — || February 3, 2009 || Mount Lemmon || Mount Lemmon Survey || — || align=right | 2.2 km || 
|-id=792 bgcolor=#fefefe
| 442792 ||  || — || October 4, 2004 || Kitt Peak || Spacewatch || — || align=right data-sort-value="0.90" | 900 m || 
|-id=793 bgcolor=#d6d6d6
| 442793 ||  || — || September 16, 2010 || Mount Lemmon || Mount Lemmon Survey || — || align=right | 3.7 km || 
|-id=794 bgcolor=#d6d6d6
| 442794 ||  || — || November 12, 2012 || Mount Lemmon || Mount Lemmon Survey || — || align=right | 3.4 km || 
|-id=795 bgcolor=#fefefe
| 442795 ||  || — || December 21, 2008 || Kitt Peak || Spacewatch || — || align=right data-sort-value="0.80" | 800 m || 
|-id=796 bgcolor=#fefefe
| 442796 ||  || — || December 17, 2001 || Kitt Peak || Spacewatch || — || align=right data-sort-value="0.68" | 680 m || 
|-id=797 bgcolor=#d6d6d6
| 442797 ||  || — || February 15, 1997 || Kitt Peak || Spacewatch || — || align=right | 3.2 km || 
|-id=798 bgcolor=#E9E9E9
| 442798 ||  || — || December 19, 2004 || Kitt Peak || Spacewatch || — || align=right data-sort-value="0.80" | 800 m || 
|-id=799 bgcolor=#fefefe
| 442799 ||  || — || November 20, 2000 || Socorro || LINEAR || — || align=right | 1.00 km || 
|-id=800 bgcolor=#d6d6d6
| 442800 ||  || — || July 14, 2009 || Kitt Peak || Spacewatch || THB || align=right | 3.8 km || 
|}

442801–442900 

|-bgcolor=#E9E9E9
| 442801 ||  || — || February 19, 2009 || Mount Lemmon || Mount Lemmon Survey || — || align=right | 1.2 km || 
|-id=802 bgcolor=#E9E9E9
| 442802 ||  || — || December 29, 2003 || Kitt Peak || Spacewatch || — || align=right | 2.0 km || 
|-id=803 bgcolor=#d6d6d6
| 442803 ||  || — || February 29, 2008 || Kitt Peak || Spacewatch || — || align=right | 2.3 km || 
|-id=804 bgcolor=#E9E9E9
| 442804 ||  || — || June 8, 2005 || Kitt Peak || Spacewatch || — || align=right | 2.5 km || 
|-id=805 bgcolor=#E9E9E9
| 442805 ||  || — || November 7, 2007 || Catalina || CSS || — || align=right | 1.9 km || 
|-id=806 bgcolor=#d6d6d6
| 442806 ||  || — || September 17, 2006 || Kitt Peak || Spacewatch || — || align=right | 2.4 km || 
|-id=807 bgcolor=#E9E9E9
| 442807 ||  || — || May 9, 2005 || Kitt Peak || Spacewatch || — || align=right | 1.8 km || 
|-id=808 bgcolor=#E9E9E9
| 442808 ||  || — || March 17, 2005 || Catalina || CSS || — || align=right | 1.1 km || 
|-id=809 bgcolor=#fefefe
| 442809 ||  || — || November 16, 1998 || Kitt Peak || Spacewatch || — || align=right data-sort-value="0.55" | 550 m || 
|-id=810 bgcolor=#fefefe
| 442810 ||  || — || December 29, 2008 || Kitt Peak || Spacewatch || MAS || align=right data-sort-value="0.76" | 760 m || 
|-id=811 bgcolor=#E9E9E9
| 442811 ||  || — || March 21, 2009 || Mount Lemmon || Mount Lemmon Survey || — || align=right | 1.1 km || 
|-id=812 bgcolor=#E9E9E9
| 442812 ||  || — || December 19, 2003 || Socorro || LINEAR || JUN || align=right | 1.1 km || 
|-id=813 bgcolor=#E9E9E9
| 442813 ||  || — || December 16, 2007 || Kitt Peak || Spacewatch || AGN || align=right | 1.1 km || 
|-id=814 bgcolor=#E9E9E9
| 442814 ||  || — || August 27, 2006 || Kitt Peak || Spacewatch || AGN || align=right | 1.2 km || 
|-id=815 bgcolor=#fefefe
| 442815 ||  || — || December 4, 2005 || Kitt Peak || Spacewatch || — || align=right data-sort-value="0.82" | 820 m || 
|-id=816 bgcolor=#E9E9E9
| 442816 ||  || — || December 29, 2003 || Catalina || CSS || — || align=right | 2.6 km || 
|-id=817 bgcolor=#E9E9E9
| 442817 ||  || — || November 2, 2007 || Kitt Peak || Spacewatch || — || align=right | 1.9 km || 
|-id=818 bgcolor=#E9E9E9
| 442818 ||  || — || December 8, 2012 || Kitt Peak || Spacewatch || — || align=right | 1.7 km || 
|-id=819 bgcolor=#E9E9E9
| 442819 ||  || — || February 4, 2009 || Mount Lemmon || Mount Lemmon Survey || — || align=right | 1.9 km || 
|-id=820 bgcolor=#fefefe
| 442820 ||  || — || November 15, 2012 || Mount Lemmon || Mount Lemmon Survey || — || align=right | 1.0 km || 
|-id=821 bgcolor=#d6d6d6
| 442821 ||  || — || May 28, 2010 || WISE || WISE || — || align=right | 3.8 km || 
|-id=822 bgcolor=#E9E9E9
| 442822 ||  || — || November 23, 2008 || Mount Lemmon || Mount Lemmon Survey || — || align=right | 1.00 km || 
|-id=823 bgcolor=#E9E9E9
| 442823 ||  || — || November 16, 2003 || Kitt Peak || Spacewatch || — || align=right | 1.6 km || 
|-id=824 bgcolor=#fefefe
| 442824 ||  || — || October 10, 2004 || Kitt Peak || Spacewatch || — || align=right data-sort-value="0.82" | 820 m || 
|-id=825 bgcolor=#E9E9E9
| 442825 ||  || — || March 29, 2009 || Kitt Peak || Spacewatch || AEO || align=right | 1.2 km || 
|-id=826 bgcolor=#E9E9E9
| 442826 ||  || — || November 17, 2007 || Mount Lemmon || Mount Lemmon Survey || — || align=right | 2.2 km || 
|-id=827 bgcolor=#E9E9E9
| 442827 ||  || — || October 12, 1999 || Socorro || LINEAR || — || align=right | 1.3 km || 
|-id=828 bgcolor=#d6d6d6
| 442828 ||  || — || December 30, 2007 || Kitt Peak || Spacewatch || — || align=right | 2.6 km || 
|-id=829 bgcolor=#fefefe
| 442829 ||  || — || November 18, 2008 || Kitt Peak || Spacewatch || MAS || align=right data-sort-value="0.73" | 730 m || 
|-id=830 bgcolor=#d6d6d6
| 442830 ||  || — || February 10, 2008 || Mount Lemmon || Mount Lemmon Survey || — || align=right | 2.6 km || 
|-id=831 bgcolor=#E9E9E9
| 442831 ||  || — || February 28, 2009 || Mount Lemmon || Mount Lemmon Survey || — || align=right | 1.9 km || 
|-id=832 bgcolor=#fefefe
| 442832 ||  || — || December 7, 2012 || Mount Lemmon || Mount Lemmon Survey || — || align=right data-sort-value="0.91" | 910 m || 
|-id=833 bgcolor=#d6d6d6
| 442833 ||  || — || July 12, 2005 || Mount Lemmon || Mount Lemmon Survey || — || align=right | 2.3 km || 
|-id=834 bgcolor=#E9E9E9
| 442834 ||  || — || March 1, 2005 || Catalina || CSS || — || align=right data-sort-value="0.99" | 990 m || 
|-id=835 bgcolor=#E9E9E9
| 442835 ||  || — || October 29, 2008 || Mount Lemmon || Mount Lemmon Survey || — || align=right | 1.7 km || 
|-id=836 bgcolor=#fefefe
| 442836 ||  || — || September 9, 2008 || Mount Lemmon || Mount Lemmon Survey || MAS || align=right data-sort-value="0.90" | 900 m || 
|-id=837 bgcolor=#fefefe
| 442837 ||  || — || December 27, 2005 || Kitt Peak || Spacewatch || — || align=right data-sort-value="0.71" | 710 m || 
|-id=838 bgcolor=#d6d6d6
| 442838 ||  || — || November 19, 2007 || Mount Lemmon || Mount Lemmon Survey || — || align=right | 3.2 km || 
|-id=839 bgcolor=#fefefe
| 442839 ||  || — || October 6, 2000 || Anderson Mesa || LONEOS || MAS || align=right data-sort-value="0.82" | 820 m || 
|-id=840 bgcolor=#d6d6d6
| 442840 ||  || — || December 12, 2012 || Kitt Peak || Spacewatch || THB || align=right | 3.0 km || 
|-id=841 bgcolor=#d6d6d6
| 442841 ||  || — || January 5, 2013 || Kitt Peak || Spacewatch || — || align=right | 3.2 km || 
|-id=842 bgcolor=#d6d6d6
| 442842 ||  || — || February 9, 2008 || Mount Lemmon || Mount Lemmon Survey || — || align=right | 3.2 km || 
|-id=843 bgcolor=#d6d6d6
| 442843 ||  || — || June 14, 2005 || Mount Lemmon || Mount Lemmon Survey || — || align=right | 3.2 km || 
|-id=844 bgcolor=#fefefe
| 442844 ||  || — || January 21, 2006 || Kitt Peak || Spacewatch || — || align=right data-sort-value="0.86" | 860 m || 
|-id=845 bgcolor=#d6d6d6
| 442845 ||  || — || February 2, 2008 || Kitt Peak || Spacewatch || — || align=right | 2.8 km || 
|-id=846 bgcolor=#E9E9E9
| 442846 ||  || — || October 9, 2007 || Mount Lemmon || Mount Lemmon Survey || — || align=right | 1.5 km || 
|-id=847 bgcolor=#fefefe
| 442847 ||  || — || February 25, 2006 || Kitt Peak || Spacewatch || — || align=right | 1.1 km || 
|-id=848 bgcolor=#fefefe
| 442848 ||  || — || August 23, 2004 || Kitt Peak || Spacewatch || — || align=right data-sort-value="0.77" | 770 m || 
|-id=849 bgcolor=#E9E9E9
| 442849 ||  || — || November 8, 2007 || Kitt Peak || Spacewatch || — || align=right | 2.4 km || 
|-id=850 bgcolor=#E9E9E9
| 442850 ||  || — || September 16, 2001 || Socorro || LINEAR || DOR || align=right | 3.5 km || 
|-id=851 bgcolor=#E9E9E9
| 442851 ||  || — || December 30, 2008 || Mount Lemmon || Mount Lemmon Survey || — || align=right data-sort-value="0.80" | 800 m || 
|-id=852 bgcolor=#E9E9E9
| 442852 ||  || — || March 2, 2009 || Kitt Peak || Spacewatch || — || align=right | 1.8 km || 
|-id=853 bgcolor=#E9E9E9
| 442853 ||  || — || January 18, 2009 || XuYi || PMO NEO || — || align=right | 1.3 km || 
|-id=854 bgcolor=#E9E9E9
| 442854 ||  || — || September 19, 2011 || Mount Lemmon || Mount Lemmon Survey || — || align=right | 1.9 km || 
|-id=855 bgcolor=#E9E9E9
| 442855 ||  || — || November 7, 2007 || Kitt Peak || Spacewatch || — || align=right | 1.9 km || 
|-id=856 bgcolor=#E9E9E9
| 442856 ||  || — || December 21, 2003 || Kitt Peak || Spacewatch || — || align=right | 1.6 km || 
|-id=857 bgcolor=#fefefe
| 442857 ||  || — || January 18, 2009 || Mount Lemmon || Mount Lemmon Survey || — || align=right data-sort-value="0.89" | 890 m || 
|-id=858 bgcolor=#E9E9E9
| 442858 ||  || — || December 22, 2008 || Kitt Peak || Spacewatch || — || align=right data-sort-value="0.75" | 750 m || 
|-id=859 bgcolor=#E9E9E9
| 442859 ||  || — || March 22, 2009 || Mount Lemmon || Mount Lemmon Survey || — || align=right | 1.8 km || 
|-id=860 bgcolor=#d6d6d6
| 442860 ||  || — || February 20, 2009 || Kitt Peak || Spacewatch || — || align=right | 2.9 km || 
|-id=861 bgcolor=#E9E9E9
| 442861 ||  || — || October 10, 2007 || Kitt Peak || Spacewatch || — || align=right | 1.3 km || 
|-id=862 bgcolor=#d6d6d6
| 442862 ||  || — || April 15, 2010 || WISE || WISE || — || align=right | 2.4 km || 
|-id=863 bgcolor=#E9E9E9
| 442863 ||  || — || June 10, 2010 || Kitt Peak || Spacewatch || — || align=right | 1.4 km || 
|-id=864 bgcolor=#d6d6d6
| 442864 ||  || — || April 27, 2009 || Kitt Peak || Spacewatch || — || align=right | 2.4 km || 
|-id=865 bgcolor=#d6d6d6
| 442865 ||  || — || May 1, 2010 || WISE || WISE || — || align=right | 2.7 km || 
|-id=866 bgcolor=#d6d6d6
| 442866 ||  || — || April 7, 2003 || Kitt Peak || Spacewatch || — || align=right | 2.4 km || 
|-id=867 bgcolor=#E9E9E9
| 442867 ||  || — || March 4, 2005 || Mount Lemmon || Mount Lemmon Survey || — || align=right | 1.2 km || 
|-id=868 bgcolor=#E9E9E9
| 442868 ||  || — || June 14, 2007 || Kitt Peak || Spacewatch || — || align=right | 1.2 km || 
|-id=869 bgcolor=#E9E9E9
| 442869 ||  || — || September 13, 2007 || Mount Lemmon || Mount Lemmon Survey || — || align=right | 1.2 km || 
|-id=870 bgcolor=#d6d6d6
| 442870 ||  || — || September 10, 2010 || Mount Lemmon || Mount Lemmon Survey || TIR || align=right | 2.8 km || 
|-id=871 bgcolor=#d6d6d6
| 442871 ||  || — || January 17, 2013 || Kitt Peak || Spacewatch || EOS || align=right | 1.6 km || 
|-id=872 bgcolor=#E9E9E9
| 442872 ||  || — || May 7, 2005 || Kitt Peak || Spacewatch || — || align=right | 1.6 km || 
|-id=873 bgcolor=#E9E9E9
| 442873 ||  || — || February 3, 2000 || Kitt Peak || Spacewatch || — || align=right | 1.7 km || 
|-id=874 bgcolor=#E9E9E9
| 442874 ||  || — || October 20, 2011 || Mount Lemmon || Mount Lemmon Survey || — || align=right | 1.3 km || 
|-id=875 bgcolor=#d6d6d6
| 442875 ||  || — || November 22, 2006 || Mount Lemmon || Mount Lemmon Survey || EOS || align=right | 1.9 km || 
|-id=876 bgcolor=#E9E9E9
| 442876 ||  || — || January 5, 2013 || Mount Lemmon || Mount Lemmon Survey || — || align=right | 1.9 km || 
|-id=877 bgcolor=#E9E9E9
| 442877 ||  || — || December 8, 2012 || Mount Lemmon || Mount Lemmon Survey || — || align=right | 2.7 km || 
|-id=878 bgcolor=#E9E9E9
| 442878 ||  || — || January 16, 2013 || Catalina || CSS || — || align=right | 1.4 km || 
|-id=879 bgcolor=#E9E9E9
| 442879 ||  || — || February 4, 2009 || Mount Lemmon || Mount Lemmon Survey || (5) || align=right data-sort-value="0.84" | 840 m || 
|-id=880 bgcolor=#E9E9E9
| 442880 ||  || — || January 5, 2013 || Mount Lemmon || Mount Lemmon Survey || — || align=right | 1.2 km || 
|-id=881 bgcolor=#fefefe
| 442881 ||  || — || October 10, 2004 || Kitt Peak || Spacewatch || MAS || align=right data-sort-value="0.68" | 680 m || 
|-id=882 bgcolor=#d6d6d6
| 442882 ||  || — || February 10, 2008 || Mount Lemmon || Mount Lemmon Survey || — || align=right | 3.0 km || 
|-id=883 bgcolor=#E9E9E9
| 442883 ||  || — || January 17, 2009 || Kitt Peak || Spacewatch || MAR || align=right data-sort-value="0.84" | 840 m || 
|-id=884 bgcolor=#d6d6d6
| 442884 ||  || — || January 19, 2008 || Mount Lemmon || Mount Lemmon Survey || INA || align=right | 3.1 km || 
|-id=885 bgcolor=#d6d6d6
| 442885 ||  || — || September 26, 2006 || Kitt Peak || Spacewatch || KOR || align=right | 1.0 km || 
|-id=886 bgcolor=#E9E9E9
| 442886 ||  || — || September 23, 2011 || Kitt Peak || Spacewatch || — || align=right | 2.1 km || 
|-id=887 bgcolor=#E9E9E9
| 442887 ||  || — || November 13, 2007 || Kitt Peak || Spacewatch || WIT || align=right data-sort-value="0.81" | 810 m || 
|-id=888 bgcolor=#d6d6d6
| 442888 ||  || — || February 12, 2008 || Kitt Peak || Spacewatch || — || align=right | 2.1 km || 
|-id=889 bgcolor=#E9E9E9
| 442889 ||  || — || January 19, 2009 || Mount Lemmon || Mount Lemmon Survey || EUN || align=right | 1.1 km || 
|-id=890 bgcolor=#E9E9E9
| 442890 ||  || — || August 28, 2006 || Kitt Peak || Spacewatch || HOF || align=right | 2.3 km || 
|-id=891 bgcolor=#E9E9E9
| 442891 ||  || — || September 29, 2011 || Mount Lemmon || Mount Lemmon Survey || — || align=right | 1.1 km || 
|-id=892 bgcolor=#d6d6d6
| 442892 ||  || — || June 7, 2010 || WISE || WISE || — || align=right | 2.7 km || 
|-id=893 bgcolor=#E9E9E9
| 442893 ||  || — || October 8, 2007 || Catalina || CSS || — || align=right | 1.4 km || 
|-id=894 bgcolor=#E9E9E9
| 442894 ||  || — || February 22, 2009 || Kitt Peak || Spacewatch || — || align=right | 1.6 km || 
|-id=895 bgcolor=#d6d6d6
| 442895 ||  || — || December 15, 2007 || Catalina || CSS || BRA || align=right | 1.6 km || 
|-id=896 bgcolor=#fefefe
| 442896 ||  || — || January 2, 2009 || Mount Lemmon || Mount Lemmon Survey || NYS || align=right data-sort-value="0.71" | 710 m || 
|-id=897 bgcolor=#E9E9E9
| 442897 ||  || — || February 19, 2009 || Kitt Peak || Spacewatch || — || align=right data-sort-value="0.83" | 830 m || 
|-id=898 bgcolor=#fefefe
| 442898 ||  || — || January 16, 2013 || Catalina || CSS || — || align=right data-sort-value="0.97" | 970 m || 
|-id=899 bgcolor=#d6d6d6
| 442899 ||  || — || July 30, 2009 || Kitt Peak || Spacewatch || — || align=right | 4.7 km || 
|-id=900 bgcolor=#E9E9E9
| 442900 ||  || — || April 2, 2000 || Kitt Peak || Spacewatch || — || align=right | 1.5 km || 
|}

442901–443000 

|-bgcolor=#E9E9E9
| 442901 ||  || — || February 5, 2009 || Mount Lemmon || Mount Lemmon Survey || — || align=right | 2.1 km || 
|-id=902 bgcolor=#d6d6d6
| 442902 ||  || — || January 5, 2013 || Kitt Peak || Spacewatch || — || align=right | 3.7 km || 
|-id=903 bgcolor=#E9E9E9
| 442903 ||  || — || November 26, 2003 || Kitt Peak || Spacewatch || — || align=right | 1.3 km || 
|-id=904 bgcolor=#d6d6d6
| 442904 ||  || — || October 23, 2011 || Mount Lemmon || Mount Lemmon Survey || — || align=right | 2.0 km || 
|-id=905 bgcolor=#E9E9E9
| 442905 ||  || — || February 3, 2009 || Kitt Peak || Spacewatch || — || align=right | 1.2 km || 
|-id=906 bgcolor=#d6d6d6
| 442906 ||  || — || February 1, 2013 || Kitt Peak || Spacewatch || — || align=right | 2.4 km || 
|-id=907 bgcolor=#E9E9E9
| 442907 ||  || — || February 27, 2009 || Catalina || CSS || — || align=right data-sort-value="0.99" | 990 m || 
|-id=908 bgcolor=#E9E9E9
| 442908 ||  || — || September 29, 1997 || Kitt Peak || Spacewatch || — || align=right | 2.1 km || 
|-id=909 bgcolor=#E9E9E9
| 442909 ||  || — || September 18, 2007 || Siding Spring || SSS || — || align=right | 2.5 km || 
|-id=910 bgcolor=#E9E9E9
| 442910 ||  || — || January 19, 2013 || Mount Lemmon || Mount Lemmon Survey || — || align=right | 2.0 km || 
|-id=911 bgcolor=#E9E9E9
| 442911 ||  || — || September 28, 2003 || Anderson Mesa || LONEOS || MAR || align=right data-sort-value="0.95" | 950 m || 
|-id=912 bgcolor=#d6d6d6
| 442912 ||  || — || January 22, 2002 || Kitt Peak || Spacewatch || — || align=right | 2.3 km || 
|-id=913 bgcolor=#d6d6d6
| 442913 ||  || — || March 2, 2008 || Kitt Peak || Spacewatch || VER || align=right | 2.7 km || 
|-id=914 bgcolor=#d6d6d6
| 442914 ||  || — || January 10, 2007 || Kitt Peak || Spacewatch || — || align=right | 4.7 km || 
|-id=915 bgcolor=#d6d6d6
| 442915 ||  || — || January 7, 2013 || Kitt Peak || Spacewatch || — || align=right | 2.9 km || 
|-id=916 bgcolor=#E9E9E9
| 442916 ||  || — || January 31, 2009 || Mount Lemmon || Mount Lemmon Survey || — || align=right | 1.7 km || 
|-id=917 bgcolor=#E9E9E9
| 442917 ||  || — || October 30, 2007 || Mount Lemmon || Mount Lemmon Survey || — || align=right | 1.2 km || 
|-id=918 bgcolor=#E9E9E9
| 442918 ||  || — || January 25, 2009 || Kitt Peak || Spacewatch || — || align=right | 1.9 km || 
|-id=919 bgcolor=#d6d6d6
| 442919 ||  || — || August 23, 2004 || Kitt Peak || Spacewatch || — || align=right | 2.9 km || 
|-id=920 bgcolor=#E9E9E9
| 442920 ||  || — || March 29, 2009 || Mount Lemmon || Mount Lemmon Survey || — || align=right | 1.8 km || 
|-id=921 bgcolor=#E9E9E9
| 442921 ||  || — || October 15, 2007 || Mount Lemmon || Mount Lemmon Survey || — || align=right | 1.1 km || 
|-id=922 bgcolor=#d6d6d6
| 442922 ||  || — || February 2, 2008 || Kitt Peak || Spacewatch || EOS || align=right | 1.8 km || 
|-id=923 bgcolor=#d6d6d6
| 442923 ||  || — || September 16, 2010 || Kitt Peak || Spacewatch || — || align=right | 3.5 km || 
|-id=924 bgcolor=#fefefe
| 442924 ||  || — || November 18, 1998 || Kitt Peak || Spacewatch || — || align=right data-sort-value="0.67" | 670 m || 
|-id=925 bgcolor=#fefefe
| 442925 ||  || — || September 26, 2000 || Socorro || LINEAR || MAS || align=right | 1.0 km || 
|-id=926 bgcolor=#d6d6d6
| 442926 ||  || — || January 7, 2013 || Kitt Peak || Spacewatch || — || align=right | 3.3 km || 
|-id=927 bgcolor=#E9E9E9
| 442927 ||  || — || March 17, 2009 || Kitt Peak || Spacewatch || — || align=right | 2.0 km || 
|-id=928 bgcolor=#E9E9E9
| 442928 ||  || — || September 29, 2003 || Kitt Peak || Spacewatch || (5) || align=right data-sort-value="0.92" | 920 m || 
|-id=929 bgcolor=#d6d6d6
| 442929 ||  || — || January 20, 2013 || Kitt Peak || Spacewatch || — || align=right | 3.1 km || 
|-id=930 bgcolor=#E9E9E9
| 442930 ||  || — || October 18, 2011 || Kitt Peak || Spacewatch || — || align=right | 2.2 km || 
|-id=931 bgcolor=#d6d6d6
| 442931 ||  || — || December 14, 2006 || Kitt Peak || Spacewatch || EOS || align=right | 2.1 km || 
|-id=932 bgcolor=#d6d6d6
| 442932 ||  || — || July 13, 2010 || WISE || WISE || — || align=right | 3.2 km || 
|-id=933 bgcolor=#E9E9E9
| 442933 ||  || — || December 13, 2007 || Socorro || LINEAR || — || align=right | 2.3 km || 
|-id=934 bgcolor=#E9E9E9
| 442934 ||  || — || October 8, 2007 || Catalina || CSS || JUN || align=right | 1.0 km || 
|-id=935 bgcolor=#E9E9E9
| 442935 ||  || — || February 26, 2009 || Kitt Peak || Spacewatch || — || align=right | 1.4 km || 
|-id=936 bgcolor=#d6d6d6
| 442936 ||  || — || May 25, 2010 || WISE || WISE || — || align=right | 2.8 km || 
|-id=937 bgcolor=#E9E9E9
| 442937 ||  || — || April 9, 2010 || Mount Lemmon || Mount Lemmon Survey || — || align=right | 1.5 km || 
|-id=938 bgcolor=#d6d6d6
| 442938 ||  || — || September 4, 2010 || Mount Lemmon || Mount Lemmon Survey || — || align=right | 3.1 km || 
|-id=939 bgcolor=#FA8072
| 442939 ||  || — || January 4, 2006 || Catalina || CSS || — || align=right data-sort-value="0.87" | 870 m || 
|-id=940 bgcolor=#d6d6d6
| 442940 ||  || — || February 5, 2013 || Mount Lemmon || Mount Lemmon Survey || EOS || align=right | 1.6 km || 
|-id=941 bgcolor=#d6d6d6
| 442941 ||  || — || February 5, 2013 || Catalina || CSS || — || align=right | 2.8 km || 
|-id=942 bgcolor=#d6d6d6
| 442942 ||  || — || January 20, 2013 || Kitt Peak || Spacewatch || — || align=right | 3.1 km || 
|-id=943 bgcolor=#d6d6d6
| 442943 ||  || — || January 14, 1996 || Kitt Peak || Spacewatch || — || align=right | 4.0 km || 
|-id=944 bgcolor=#d6d6d6
| 442944 ||  || — || August 15, 2009 || Kitt Peak || Spacewatch || — || align=right | 2.5 km || 
|-id=945 bgcolor=#E9E9E9
| 442945 ||  || — || December 29, 2003 || Catalina || CSS || EUN || align=right | 1.4 km || 
|-id=946 bgcolor=#d6d6d6
| 442946 ||  || — || May 1, 2008 || Kitt Peak || Spacewatch || — || align=right | 3.4 km || 
|-id=947 bgcolor=#d6d6d6
| 442947 ||  || — || February 2, 2008 || Kitt Peak || Spacewatch || EOS || align=right | 1.5 km || 
|-id=948 bgcolor=#d6d6d6
| 442948 ||  || — || February 13, 2008 || Kitt Peak || Spacewatch || — || align=right | 2.5 km || 
|-id=949 bgcolor=#E9E9E9
| 442949 ||  || — || November 1, 2007 || Kitt Peak || Spacewatch || — || align=right | 1.3 km || 
|-id=950 bgcolor=#E9E9E9
| 442950 ||  || — || February 2, 2013 || Kitt Peak || Spacewatch || — || align=right | 2.1 km || 
|-id=951 bgcolor=#d6d6d6
| 442951 ||  || — || March 8, 2008 || Kitt Peak || Spacewatch || — || align=right | 3.2 km || 
|-id=952 bgcolor=#E9E9E9
| 442952 ||  || — || August 19, 2006 || Kitt Peak || Spacewatch || — || align=right | 1.6 km || 
|-id=953 bgcolor=#E9E9E9
| 442953 ||  || — || January 28, 2004 || Kitt Peak || Spacewatch || — || align=right | 1.6 km || 
|-id=954 bgcolor=#d6d6d6
| 442954 ||  || — || July 27, 2010 || WISE || WISE || — || align=right | 4.0 km || 
|-id=955 bgcolor=#d6d6d6
| 442955 ||  || — || February 11, 2008 || Kitt Peak || Spacewatch || — || align=right | 3.0 km || 
|-id=956 bgcolor=#d6d6d6
| 442956 ||  || — || September 11, 2004 || Kitt Peak || Spacewatch || — || align=right | 3.4 km || 
|-id=957 bgcolor=#E9E9E9
| 442957 ||  || — || May 10, 2005 || Kitt Peak || Spacewatch || — || align=right | 1.5 km || 
|-id=958 bgcolor=#E9E9E9
| 442958 ||  || — || November 2, 2007 || Kitt Peak || Spacewatch || — || align=right | 2.0 km || 
|-id=959 bgcolor=#d6d6d6
| 442959 ||  || — || January 4, 2013 || Kitt Peak || Spacewatch || — || align=right | 2.8 km || 
|-id=960 bgcolor=#d6d6d6
| 442960 ||  || — || September 24, 2005 || Kitt Peak || Spacewatch || LIX || align=right | 3.2 km || 
|-id=961 bgcolor=#d6d6d6
| 442961 ||  || — || January 21, 2013 || Mount Lemmon || Mount Lemmon Survey || — || align=right | 3.3 km || 
|-id=962 bgcolor=#E9E9E9
| 442962 ||  || — || March 1, 2009 || Kitt Peak || Spacewatch || (5) || align=right data-sort-value="0.97" | 970 m || 
|-id=963 bgcolor=#d6d6d6
| 442963 ||  || — || February 16, 2007 || Catalina || CSS || — || align=right | 3.3 km || 
|-id=964 bgcolor=#d6d6d6
| 442964 ||  || — || October 29, 1999 || Kitt Peak || Spacewatch || — || align=right | 3.0 km || 
|-id=965 bgcolor=#d6d6d6
| 442965 ||  || — || February 10, 2002 || Kitt Peak || Spacewatch || EOS || align=right | 1.8 km || 
|-id=966 bgcolor=#d6d6d6
| 442966 ||  || — || January 17, 2013 || Mount Lemmon || Mount Lemmon Survey || — || align=right | 3.2 km || 
|-id=967 bgcolor=#E9E9E9
| 442967 ||  || — || October 21, 2006 || Mount Lemmon || Mount Lemmon Survey || — || align=right | 2.3 km || 
|-id=968 bgcolor=#d6d6d6
| 442968 ||  || — || July 7, 2010 || WISE || WISE || 7:4 || align=right | 7.5 km || 
|-id=969 bgcolor=#E9E9E9
| 442969 ||  || — || November 14, 1995 || Kitt Peak || Spacewatch || — || align=right | 1.2 km || 
|-id=970 bgcolor=#E9E9E9
| 442970 ||  || — || December 18, 2003 || Socorro || LINEAR || — || align=right | 2.3 km || 
|-id=971 bgcolor=#E9E9E9
| 442971 ||  || — || October 18, 2007 || Kitt Peak || Spacewatch || — || align=right | 1.3 km || 
|-id=972 bgcolor=#E9E9E9
| 442972 ||  || — || December 4, 2007 || Mount Lemmon || Mount Lemmon Survey || WIT || align=right | 1.2 km || 
|-id=973 bgcolor=#E9E9E9
| 442973 ||  || — || October 3, 2011 || XuYi || PMO NEO || — || align=right | 2.4 km || 
|-id=974 bgcolor=#d6d6d6
| 442974 ||  || — || March 7, 2008 || Mount Lemmon || Mount Lemmon Survey || — || align=right | 2.4 km || 
|-id=975 bgcolor=#E9E9E9
| 442975 ||  || — || December 4, 2007 || Kitt Peak || Spacewatch || critical || align=right | 1.8 km || 
|-id=976 bgcolor=#E9E9E9
| 442976 ||  || — || October 22, 2006 || Catalina || CSS || AGN || align=right | 1.4 km || 
|-id=977 bgcolor=#E9E9E9
| 442977 ||  || — || March 3, 2005 || Kitt Peak || Spacewatch || — || align=right data-sort-value="0.92" | 920 m || 
|-id=978 bgcolor=#d6d6d6
| 442978 ||  || — || February 14, 2013 || Kitt Peak || Spacewatch || — || align=right | 2.8 km || 
|-id=979 bgcolor=#d6d6d6
| 442979 ||  || — || February 6, 2007 || Kitt Peak || Spacewatch || — || align=right | 2.7 km || 
|-id=980 bgcolor=#d6d6d6
| 442980 ||  || — || January 9, 2013 || Mount Lemmon || Mount Lemmon Survey || — || align=right | 3.7 km || 
|-id=981 bgcolor=#d6d6d6
| 442981 ||  || — || March 13, 2008 || Mount Lemmon || Mount Lemmon Survey || — || align=right | 2.8 km || 
|-id=982 bgcolor=#d6d6d6
| 442982 ||  || — || January 30, 2008 || Mount Lemmon || Mount Lemmon Survey || — || align=right | 2.4 km || 
|-id=983 bgcolor=#E9E9E9
| 442983 ||  || — || February 14, 2013 || Kitt Peak || Spacewatch || — || align=right | 2.4 km || 
|-id=984 bgcolor=#d6d6d6
| 442984 ||  || — || February 8, 2008 || Mount Lemmon || Mount Lemmon Survey || — || align=right | 2.9 km || 
|-id=985 bgcolor=#d6d6d6
| 442985 ||  || — || February 2, 2008 || Mount Lemmon || Mount Lemmon Survey || — || align=right | 2.4 km || 
|-id=986 bgcolor=#E9E9E9
| 442986 ||  || — || October 21, 2006 || Mount Lemmon || Mount Lemmon Survey || — || align=right | 2.4 km || 
|-id=987 bgcolor=#d6d6d6
| 442987 ||  || — || November 17, 2011 || Mount Lemmon || Mount Lemmon Survey || — || align=right | 2.1 km || 
|-id=988 bgcolor=#d6d6d6
| 442988 ||  || — || March 24, 2003 || Kitt Peak || Spacewatch || EOS || align=right | 2.3 km || 
|-id=989 bgcolor=#d6d6d6
| 442989 ||  || — || November 2, 2011 || Mount Lemmon || Mount Lemmon Survey || — || align=right | 2.3 km || 
|-id=990 bgcolor=#fefefe
| 442990 ||  || — || January 3, 2009 || Mount Lemmon || Mount Lemmon Survey || NYS || align=right data-sort-value="0.77" | 770 m || 
|-id=991 bgcolor=#d6d6d6
| 442991 ||  || — || September 18, 2010 || Mount Lemmon || Mount Lemmon Survey || — || align=right | 3.1 km || 
|-id=992 bgcolor=#fefefe
| 442992 ||  || — || October 22, 2008 || Kitt Peak || Spacewatch || — || align=right data-sort-value="0.86" | 860 m || 
|-id=993 bgcolor=#E9E9E9
| 442993 ||  || — || September 22, 2011 || Catalina || CSS || MAR || align=right | 1.1 km || 
|-id=994 bgcolor=#E9E9E9
| 442994 ||  || — || December 5, 2007 || Kitt Peak || Spacewatch || AEO || align=right | 1.3 km || 
|-id=995 bgcolor=#d6d6d6
| 442995 ||  || — || November 3, 2011 || Mount Lemmon || Mount Lemmon Survey || — || align=right | 2.5 km || 
|-id=996 bgcolor=#d6d6d6
| 442996 ||  || — || December 15, 2006 || Kitt Peak || Spacewatch || — || align=right | 3.7 km || 
|-id=997 bgcolor=#E9E9E9
| 442997 ||  || — || March 10, 2000 || Kitt Peak || Spacewatch || — || align=right | 1.9 km || 
|-id=998 bgcolor=#E9E9E9
| 442998 ||  || — || February 7, 1997 || Kitt Peak || Spacewatch || — || align=right data-sort-value="0.96" | 960 m || 
|-id=999 bgcolor=#E9E9E9
| 442999 ||  || — || October 21, 1995 || Kitt Peak || Spacewatch || RAF || align=right | 1.0 km || 
|-id=000 bgcolor=#d6d6d6
| 443000 ||  || — || January 10, 2007 || Mount Lemmon || Mount Lemmon Survey || — || align=right | 3.1 km || 
|}

References

External links 
 Discovery Circumstances: Numbered Minor Planets (440001)–(445000) (IAU Minor Planet Center)

0442